The following is a list of players, both past and current, who appeared at least in one game for the San Antonio Spurs National Basketball Association and American Basketball Association franchise.



Players
Note: Statistics are correct through the end of the  season.

A to B

|-
|align="left"| || align="center"|G || align="left"|Missouri State || align="center"|1 || align="center"| || 3 || 19 || 1 || 2 || 8 || 6.3 || 0.3 || 0.7 || 2.7 || align=center|
|-
|align="left" bgcolor="#FFCC00"|+ || align="center"|F/C || align="left"|Texas || align="center"|6 || align="center"|– || 376 || 12,090 || 3,020 || 760 || 7,325 || 32.2 || 8.0 || 2.0 || 19.5 || align=center|
|-
|align="left"| || align="center"|G || align="left"|Virginia || align="center"|3 || align="center"|– || 177 || 2,515 || 212 || 446 || 910 || 14.2 || 1.2 || 2.5 || 5.1 || align=center|
|-
|align="left"| || align="center"|F/C || align="left"|Houston || align="center"|4 || align="center"|–– || 292 || 6,388 || 1,737 || 184 || 2,460 || 21.9 || 5.9 || 0.6 || 8.4 || align=center|
|-
|align="left"| || align="center"|G || align="left"|Kentucky || align="center"|1 || align="center"| || 82 || 2,859 || 363 || 301 || 1,269 || 34.9 || 4.4 || 3.7 || 15.5 || align=center|
|-
|align="left"| || align="center"|G/F || align="left"|Oklahoma State || align="center"|3 || align="center"|– || 87 || 983 || 116 || 68 || 318 || 11.3 || 1.3 || 0.8 || 3.7 || align=center|
|-
|align="left"| || align="center"|G/F || align="left"|UCLA || align="center"|4 || align="center"|– || 257 || 4,601 || 920 || 444 || 1,255 || 17.9 || 3.6 || 1.7 || 4.9 || align=center|
|-
|align="left"| || align="center"|G || align="left"|Drexel || align="center"|1 || align="center"| || 36 || 730 || 89 || 153 || 204 || 20.3 || 2.5 || 4.3 || 5.7 || align=center|
|-
|align="left"| || align="center"|G/F || align="left"|Georgia || align="center"|7 || align="center"|– || 451 || 13,611 || 1,794 || 1,874 || 5,946 || 30.2 || 4.0 || 4.2 || 13.2 || align=center|
|-
|align="left"| || align="center"|C || align="left"|UNLV || align="center"|1 || align="center"| || 19 || 122 || 31 || 3 || 25 || 6.4 || 1.6 || 0.2 || 1.3 || align=center|
|-
|align="left"| || align="center"|G || align="left"|Pepperdine || align="center"|1 || align="center"| || 74 || 1,639 || 121 || 132 || 851 || 22.1 || 1.6 || 1.8 || 11.5 || align=center|
|-
|align="left"| || align="center"|F || align="left"|Arizona State || align="center"|2 || align="center"|– || 124 || 1,335 || 375 || 74 || 377 || 10.8 || 3.0 || 0.6 || 3.0 || align=center|
|-
|align="left"| || align="center"|G/F || align="left"|Duke || align="center"|4 || align="center"|– || 323 || 9,113 || 2,050 || 914 || 3,800 || 28.2 || 6.3 || 2.8 || 11.8 || align=center|
|-
|align="left"| || align="center"|G || align="left"|Illinois || align="center"|1 || align="center"| || 1 || 1 || 1 || 0 || 0 || 1.0 || 1.0 || 0.0 || 0.0 || align=center|
|-
|align="left"| || align="center"|G || align="left"|Oregon State || align="center"|4 || align="center"|– || 261 || 5,186 || 564 || 493 || 1,888 || 19.9 || 2.2 || 1.9 || 7.2 || align=center|
|-
|align="left"| || align="center"|F/C || align="left"|Georgia || align="center"|1 || align="center"| || 5 || 72 || 15 || 10 || 10 || 14.4 || 3.0 || 2.0 || 2.0 || align=center|
|-
|align="left"| || align="center"|C || align="left"| Beijing Ducks || align="center"|1 || align="center"| || 12 || 46 || 10 || 4 || 9 || 3.8 || 0.8 || 0.3 || 0.8 || align=center|
|-
|align="left" bgcolor="#CCFFCC"|x || align="center"|F || align="left"|Ohio State || align="center"|2 || align="center"|– || 89 || 1201 || 280 || 53 || 414 || 13.5 || 3.1 || 0.6 || 4.7 || align=center|
|-
|align="left"| || align="center"|C || align="left"|Notre Dame || align="center"|1 || align="center"| || 4 || 31 || 4 || 3 || 10 || 7.8 || 1.0 || 0.8 || 2.5 || align=center|
|-
|align="left"| || align="center"|C || align="left"|Washington State || align="center"|3 || align="center"|– || 139 || 1,754 || 495 || 74 || 665 || 12.6 || 3.6 || 0.5 || 4.8 || align=center|
|-
|align="left"| || align="center"|G/F || align="left"|SMU || align="center"|4 || align="center"|– || 276 || 7,324 || 703 || 858 || 2,622 || 26.5 || 2.5 || 3.1 || 9.5 || align=center|
|-
|align="left" bgcolor="#FFCC00"|+ || align="center"|F/C || align="left"|Texas A&M || align="center"|5 || align="center"|– || 334 || 11,915 || 3,673 || 514 || 5,983 || 35.7 || 11.0 || 1.5 || 17.9 || align=center|
|-
|align="left"| || align="center"|F || align="left"|Arizona State || align="center"|1 || align="center"| || 6 || 50 || 12 || 0 || 20 || 8.3 || 2.0 || 0.0 || 3.3 || align=center|
|-
|align="left"| || align="center"|F || align="left"|Stanford || align="center"|3 || align="center"|– || 193 || 2,985 || 880 || 241 || 1,465 || 15.5 || 4.6 || 1.2 || 7.6 || align=center|
|-
|align="left"| || align="center"|C || align="left"|Memphis || align="center"|1 || align="center"| || 16 || 66 || 10 || 0 || 25 || 4.1 || 0.6 || 0.0 || 1.6 || align=center|
|-
|align="left"| || align="center"|G/F || align="left"| Fortitudo Bologna || align="center"|4 || align="center"|–– || 278 || 6,102 || 680 || 474 || 2,669 || 21.9 || 2.4 || 1.7 || 9.6 || align=center|
|-
|align="left"| || align="center"|G || align="left"|Winston-Salem State || align="center"|1 || align="center"| || 46 || 823 || 114 || 69 || 352 || 17.9 || 2.5 || 1.5 || 7.7 || align=center|
|-
|align="left"| || align="center"|F || align="left"|St. John's || align="center"|2 || align="center"|– || 129 || 3,489 || 697 || 214 || 2,260 || 27.0 || 5.4 || 1.7 || 17.5 || align=center|
|-
|align="left"| || align="center"|F || align="left"| Olimpija || align="center"|3 || align="center"|– || 220 || 3,526 || 515 || 220 || 1,365 || 16.0 || 2.3 || 1.0 || 6.2 || align=center|
|-
|align="left"| || align="center"|C || align="left"|Indiana || align="center"|1 || align="center"| || 7 || 50 || 9 || 1 || 15 || 7.1 || 1.3 || 0.1 || 2.1 || align=center|
|-
|align="left"| || align="center"|G || align="left"|Temple || align="center"|1 || align="center"| || 10 || 112 || 6 || 18 || 37 || 11.2 || 0.6 || 1.8 || 3.7 || align=center|
|-
|align="left"| || align="center"|F/C || align="left"|Pittsburgh || align="center"|4 || align="center"|– || 288 || 5,442 || 1,672 || 265 || 2,251 || 18.9 || 5.8 || 0.9 || 7.8 || align=center|
|-
|align="left"| || align="center"|G/F || align="left"|Kentucky || align="center"|1 || align="center"| || 79 || 1,559 || 176 || 95 || 347 || 19.7 || 2.2 || 1.2 || 4.4 || align=center|
|-
|align="left"| || align="center"|F || align="left"|Florida || align="center"|10 || align="center"|– || 632 || 10,093 || 1,802 || 448 || 3,460 || 16.0 || 2.9 || 0.7 || 5.5 || align=center|
|-
|align="left"| || align="center"|G/F || align="left"|Idaho State || align="center"|3 || align="center"|– || 204 || 6,335 || 1,071 || 693 || 3,495 || 31.1 || 5.3 || 3.4 || 17.1 || align=center|
|-
|align="left"| (#12) || align="center"|F || align="left"|Cal State Fullerton || align="center"|8 || align="center"|– || 630 || 18,689 || 1,861 || 814 || 4,061 || 29.7 || 3.0 || 1.3 || 6.4 || align=center|
|-
|align="left"| || align="center"|G/F || align="left"|Oklahoma || align="center"|1 || align="center"| || 18 || 438 || 56 || 29 || 155 || 24.3 || 3.1 || 1.6 || 8.6 || align=center|
|-
|align="left"| || align="center"|F || align="left"|Ohio State || align="center"|1 || align="center"| || 19 || 207 || 63 || 12 || 99 || 10.9 || 3.3 || 0.6 || 5.2 || align=center|
|-
|align="left"| || align="center"|G || align="left"|Stanford || align="center"|1 || align="center"| || 81 || 1,616 || 166 || 438 || 625 || 20.0 || 2.0 || 5.4 || 7.7 || align=center|
|-
|align="left"| || align="center"|G || align="left"|Arkansas || align="center"|4 || align="center"|–– || 120 || 2,362 || 156 || 210 || 1,250 || 19.7 || 1.3 || 1.8 || 10.4 || align=center|
|-
|align="left"| || align="center"|F/C || align="left"|Penn State || align="center"|4 || align="center"|– || 219 || 5,570 || 1,235 || 507 || 2,541 || 25.4 || 5.6 || 2.3 || 11.6 || align=center|
|-
|align="left"| || align="center"|G/F || align="left"|Virginia Tech || align="center"|4 || align="center"|– || 285 || 5,704 || 1,026 || 786 || 2,402 || 20.0 || 3.6 || 2.8 || 8.4 || align=center|
|-
|align="left"| || align="center"|C || align="left"|South Carolina || align="center"|2 || align="center"|– || 38 || 248 || 53 || 7 || 63 || 6.5 || 1.4 || 0.2 || 1.7 || align=center|
|-
|align="left"| || align="center"|F || align="left"|NC State || align="center"|1 || align="center"| || 30 || 602 || 77 || 41 || 190 || 20.1 || 2.6 || 1.4 || 6.3 || align=center|
|-
|align="left"| || align="center"|G || align="left"|UTSA || align="center"|3 || align="center"|– || 132 || 1,887 || 313 || 127 || 740 || 14.3 || 2.4 || 1.0 || 5.6 || align=center|
|-
|align="left"| || align="center"|C || align="left"|Kansas || align="center"|1 || align="center"| || 2 || 26 || 6 || 1 || 10 || 13.0 || 3.0 || 0.5 || 5.0 || align=center|
|-
|align="left"| || align="center"|G || align="left"|Michigan State || align="center"|1 || align="center"| || 10 || 103 || 13 || 5 || 23 || 10.3 || 1.3 || 0.5 || 2.3 || align=center|
|-
|align="left"| || align="center"|F/C || align="left"|Seton Hall || align="center"|1 || align="center"| || 30 || 206 || 44 || 10 || 56 || 6.9 || 1.5 || 0.3 || 1.9 || align=center|
|-
|align="left"| || align="center"|G/F || align="left"|Arizona || align="center"|1 || align="center"| || 11 || 140 || 22 || 11 || 33 || 12.7 || 2.0 || 1.0 || 3.0 || align=center|
|-
|align="left"| || align="center"|C || align="left"|Utah State || align="center"|1 || align="center"| || 24 || 423 || 127 || 15 || 155 || 17.6 || 5.3 || 0.6 || 6.5 || align=center|
|-
|align="left"| || align="center"|G || align="left"|Northwestern || align="center"|1 || align="center"| || 33 || 392 || 60 || 24 || 155 || 11.9 || 1.8 || 0.7 || 4.7 || align=center|
|-
|align="left"| || align="center"|G/F || align="left"|Minnesota || align="center"|1 || align="center"| || 13 || 43 || 9 || 1 || 27 || 3.3 || 0.7 || 0.1 || 2.1 || align=center|
|-
|align="left"| || align="center"|F/C || align="left"|Coastal Christian Academy (VA) || align="center"|1 || align="center"| || 11 || 103 || 22 || 5 || 41 || 9.4 || 2.0 || 0.5 || 3.7 || align=center|
|-
|align="left"| || align="center"|G/F || align="left"|La Salle || align="center"|1 || align="center"| || 46 || 432 || 56 || 24 || 124 || 9.4 || 1.2 || 0.5 || 2.7 || align=center|
|-
|align="left"| || align="center"|F || align="left"|Vanderbilt || align="center"|1 || align="center"| || 2 || 37 || 11 || 1 || 10 || 18.5 || 5.5 || 0.5 || 5.0 || align=center|
|}

C

|-
|align="left" bgcolor="#CCFFCC"|x || align="center"|F || align="left"|UNC Wilmington || align="center"|1 || align="center"| || 15 || 121 || 42 || 6 || 46 || 8.1 || 2.8 || 0.4 || 3.1 || align=center|
|-
|align="left"| || align="center"|G || align="left"|USC || align="center"|1 || align="center"| || 35 || 606 || 31 || 104 || 309 || 17.3 || 0.9 || 3.0 || 8.8 || align=center|
|-
|align="left"| || align="center"|F/C || align="left"|Wichita State || align="center"|3 || align="center"|– || 186 || 4,279 || 785 || 175 || 2,011 || 23.0 || 4.2 || 0.9 || 10.8 || align=center|
|-
|align="left"| || align="center"|F || align="left"|Missouri || align="center"|1 || align="center"| || 15 || 135 || 31 || 11 || 33 || 9.0 || 2.1 || 0.7 || 2.2 || align=center|
|-
|align="left"| || align="center"|G || align="left"|Notre Dame || align="center"|1 || align="center"| || 3 || 22 || 3 || 1 || 6 || 7.3 || 1.0 || 0.3 || 2.0 || align=center|
|-
|align="left"| || align="center"|G || align="left"|Hawaii || align="center"|1 || align="center"| || 5 || 87 || 11 || 12 || 22 || 17.4 || 2.2 || 2.4 || 4.4 || align=center|
|-
|align="left"| || align="center"|F || align="left"|Utah || align="center"|1 || align="center"| || 38 || 579 || 103 || 42 || 224 || 15.2 || 2.7 || 1.1 || 5.9 || align=center|
|-
|align="left"| || align="center"|F/C || align="left"|Wake Forest || align="center"|1 || align="center"| || 79 || 1,403 || 318 || 69 || 606 || 17.8 || 4.0 || 0.9 || 7.7 || align=center|
|-
|align="left" bgcolor="#FFFF99"|^ || align="center"|G || align="left"|West Texas A&M || align="center"|1 || align="center"| || 50 || 1,766 || 167 || 302 || 545 || 35.3 || 3.3 || 6.0 || 10.9 || align=center|
|-
|align="left"| || align="center"|C || align="left"|Grambling State || align="center"|1 || align="center"| || 1 || 7 || 1 || 0 || 0 || 7.0 || 1.0 || 0.0 || 0.0 || align=center|
|-
|align="left"| || align="center"|G || align="left"|Hofstra || align="center"|1 || align="center"| || 30 || 471 || 56 || 75 || 173 || 15.7 || 1.9 || 2.5 || 5.8 || align=center|
|-
|align="left" bgcolor="#CCFFCC"|x || align="center"|F || align="left"|Gonzaga || align="center"|1 || align="center"| || 28 || 502 || 153 || 61 || 218 || 17.9 || 5.5 || 2.2 || 7.8 || align=center|
|-
|align="left" bgcolor="#FFCC00"|+ || align="center"|G || align="left"|Virginia Tech || align="center"|3 || align="center"|– || 198 || 7,106 || 616 || 695 || 3,839 || 35.9 || 3.1 || 3.5 || 19.4 || align=center|
|-
|align="left"| || align="center"|F || align="left"|DePaul || align="center"|1 || align="center"| || 67 || 1,119 || 234 || 30 || 438 || 16.7 || 3.5 || 0.4 || 6.5 || align=center|
|-
|align="left"| || align="center"|G || align="left"|BYU || align="center"|1 || align="center"| || 20 || 261 || 26 || 36 || 80 || 13.1 || 1.3 || 1.8 || 4.0 || align=center|
|-
|align="left"| || align="center"|G || align="left"|Portland || align="center"|1 || align="center"| || 36 || 757 || 59 || 84 || 346 || 21.0 || 1.6 || 2.3 || 9.6 || align=center|
|-
|align="left"| || align="center"|F/C || align="left"|Idaho State || align="center"|2 || align="center"|– || 88 || 1,204 || 291 || 60 || 296 || 13.7 || 3.3 || 0.7 || 3.4 || align=center|
|-
|align="left"| || align="center"|C || align="left"|Marquette || align="center"|1 || align="center"| || 33 || 132 || 36 || 3 || 48 || 4.0 || 1.1 || 0.1 || 1.5 || align=center|
|-
|align="left"| || align="center"|G/F || align="left"|DePaul || align="center"|2 || align="center"|– || 47 || 906 || 144 || 91 || 339 || 19.3 || 3.1 || 1.9 || 7.2 || align=center|
|-
|align="left"| || align="center"|C || align="left"|DePaul || align="center"|2 || align="center"|– || 164 || 4,149 || 1,265 || 247 || 1,689 || 25.3 || 7.7 || 1.5 || 10.3 || align=center|
|-
|align="left"| || align="center"|F || align="left"|Michigan State || align="center"|1 || align="center"| || 4 || 32 || 9 || 2 || 4 || 8.0 || 2.3 || 0.5 || 1.0 || align=center|
|-
|align="left"| || align="center"|F || align="left"|Southern Miss || align="center"|1 || align="center"| || 5 || 48 || 7 || 0 || 13 || 9.6 || 1.4 || 0.0 || 2.6 || align=center|
|-
|align="left"| || align="center"|C || align="left"|Tennessee || align="center"|1 || align="center"| || 29 || 517 || 141 || 26 || 230 || 17.8 || 4.9 || 0.9 || 7.9 || align=center|
|-
|align="left"| || align="center"|C || align="left"|North Carolina || align="center"|1 || align="center"| || 14 || 148 || 48 || 7 || 31 || 10.6 || 3.4 || 0.5 || 2.2 || align=center|
|-
|align="left"| || align="center"|F || align="left"|Providence || align="center"|1 || align="center"| || 3 || 23 || 10 || 3 || 4 || 7.7 || 3.3 || 1.0 || 1.3 || align=center|
|-
|align="left"| || align="center"|G/F || align="left"|Kentucky Wesleyan || align="center"|1 || align="center"| || 7 || 29 || 3 || 1 || 6 || 4.1 || 0.4 || 0.1 || 0.9 || align=center|
|-
|align="left"| || align="center"|F || align="left"|DePaul || align="center"|6 || align="center"|– || 361 || 9,647 || 2,523 || 591 || 5,181 || 26.7 || 7.0 || 1.6 || 14.4 || align=center|
|-
|align="left"| || align="center"|F || align="left"|Villanova || align="center"|1 || align="center"| || 64 || 928 || 188 || 50 || 194 || 14.5 || 2.9 || 0.8 || 3.0 || align=center|
|}

D

|-
|align="left"| || align="center"|C || align="left"|New Mexico State || align="center"|1 || align="center"| || 3 || 23 || 7 || 1 || 10 || 7.7 || 2.3 || 0.3 || 3.3 || align=center|
|-
|align="left" bgcolor="#FFFF99"|^ || align="center"|G || align="left"|Kentucky || align="center"|3 || align="center"|– || 232 || 4,431 || 261 || 643 || 1,553 || 19.1 || 1.1 || 2.8 || 6.7 || align=center|
|-
|align="left"| || align="center"|G || align="left"|Bowling Green || align="center"|4 || align="center"|– || 276 || 6,044 || 479 || 815 || 2,138 || 21.9 || 1.7 || 3.0 || 7.7 || align=center|
|-
|align="left"| || align="center"|G || align="left"|Mt. SAC || align="center"|2 || align="center"|– || 142 || 2,553 || 327 || 242 || 1,071 || 18.0 || 2.3 || 1.7 || 7.5 || align=center|
|-
|align="left"| || align="center"|G || align="left"|Marshall || align="center"|1 || align="center"| || 2 || 9 || 2 || 2 || 3 || 4.5 || 1.0 || 1.0 || 1.5 || align=center|
|-
|align="left"| || align="center"|F || align="left"|Vanderbilt || align="center"|1 || align="center"| || 16 || 187 || 38 || 17 || 92 || 11.7 || 2.4 || 1.1 || 5.8 || align=center|
|-
|align="left"| || align="center"|F || align="left"|Florida State || align="center"|1 || align="center"| || 4 || 30 || 6 || 0 || 13 || 7.5 || 1.5 || 0.0 || 3.3 || align=center|
|-
|align="left"| || align="center"|C || align="left"|North Texas || align="center"|1 || align="center"| || 8 || 29 || 13 || 2 || 18 || 3.6 || 1.6 || 0.3 || 2.3 || align=center|
|-
|align="left"| || align="center"|G || align="left"|Duke || align="center"|3 || align="center"|– || 178 || 4,944 || 474 || 994 || 2,316 || 27.8 || 2.7 || 5.6 || 13.0 || align=center|
|-
|align="left"| || align="center"|F || align="left"|Midwestern State || align="center"|1 || align="center"| || 4 || 39 || 10 || 0 || 15 || 9.8 || 2.5 || 0.0 || 3.8 || align=center|
|-
|align="left"| || align="center"|F || align="left"|Gonzaga || align="center"|2 || align="center"|– || 40 || 383 || 81 || 15 || 161 || 9.6 || 2.0 || 0.4 || 4.0 || align=center|
|-
|align="left"| || align="center"|G || align="left"| Cholet Basket || align="center"|2 || align="center"|– || 98 || 1,221 || 183 || 170 || 388 || 12.5 || 1.9 || 1.7 || 4.0 || align=center|
|-
|align="left"| || align="center"|C || align="left"|USC || align="center"|1 || align="center"| || 76 || 1,330 || 496 || 44 || 387 || 17.5 || 6.5 || 0.6 || 5.1 || align=center|
|-
|align="left"| || align="center"|G || align="left"|NC State || align="center"|6 || align="center"|– || 433 || 12,565 || 1,150 || 1,566 || 4,844 || 29.0 || 2.7 || 3.6 || 11.2 || align=center|
|-
|align="left"| || align="center"|G || align="left"|Pacific || align="center"|1 || align="center"| || 16 || 87 || 9 || 8 || 53 || 5.4 || 0.6 || 0.5 || 3.3 || align=center|
|-
|align="left"| || align="center"|G || align="left"|Washington || align="center"|1 || align="center"| || 2 || 19 || 1 || 1 || 4 || 9.5 || 0.5 || 0.5 || 2.0 || align=center|
|-
|align="left"| || align="center"|G/F || align="left"|USC || align="center"|3 || align="center"|– || 206 || 7,060 || 1,096 || 1,277 || 4,455 || 34.3 || 5.3 || 6.2 || 21.6 || align=center|
|-
|align="left"| || align="center"|G || align="left"|Eastern Michigan || align="center"|2 || align="center"|– || 41 || 302 || 64 || 26 || 126 || 7.4 || 1.6 || 0.6 || 3.1 || align=center|
|-
|align="left"| || align="center"|F/C || align="left"| Élan Béarnais || align="center"|5 || align="center"|– || 331 || 7,459 || 1,246 || 858 || 2,438 || 22.5 || 3.8 || 2.6 || 7.4 || align=center|
|-
|align="left"| || align="center"|C || align="left"|Louisville || align="center"|1 || align="center"| || 16 || 181 || 42 || 19 || 85 || 11.3 || 2.6 || 1.2 || 5.3 || align=center|
|-
|align="left"| || align="center"|F/C || align="left"|San Jose State || align="center"|8 || align="center"|– || 569 || 11,849 || 2,835 || 1,285 || 3,857 || 20.8 || 5.0 || 2.3 || 6.8 || align=center|
|-
|align="left"| || align="center"|G || align="left"|Charlotte || align="center"|1 || align="center"| || 10 || 144 || 11 || 19 || 34 || 14.4 || 1.1 || 1.9 || 3.4 || align=center|
|-
|align="left"| || align="center"|F || align="left"|Arizona State || align="center"|1 || align="center"| || 2 || 14 || 1 || 0 || 2 || 7.0 || 0.5 || 0.0 || 1.0 || align=center|
|-
|align="left"| || align="center"|C || align="left"|Eastern Illinois || align="center"|1 || align="center"| || 14 || 122 || 31 || 6 || 45 || 8.7 || 2.2 || 0.4 || 3.2 || align=center|
|-
|align="left" bgcolor="#FFFF99"|^ (#21) || align="center"|F/C || align="left"|Wake Forest || align="center" bgcolor="#CFECEC"|19 || align="center"|– || bgcolor="#CFECEC"|1,392 || bgcolor="#CFECEC"|47,368 || bgcolor="#CFECEC"|15,091 || 4,225 || bgcolor="#CFECEC"|26,496 || 34.0 || 10.8 || 3.0 || 19.0 || align=center|
|-
|align="left"| || align="center"|G || align="left"|South Carolina || align="center"|1 || align="center"| || 79 || 1,619 || 134 || 437 || 613 || 20.5 || 1.7 || 5.5 || 7.8 || align=center|
|}

E to F

|-
|align="left"| || align="center"|C || align="left"|BYU || align="center"|1 || align="center"| || 16 || 251 || 46 || 17 || 89 || 15.7 || 2.9 || 1.1 || 5.6 || align=center|
|-
|align="left"| || align="center"|G || align="left"|Purdue || align="center"|1 || align="center"| || 40 || 521 || 70 || 27 || 346 || 13.0 || 1.8 || 0.7 || 8.7 || align=center|
|-
|align="left"| || align="center"|G || align="left"|Boston College || align="center"|1 || align="center"| || 15 || 56 || 6 || 18 || 7 || 3.7 || 0.4 || 1.2 || 0.5 || align=center|
|-
|align="left"| || align="center"|G/F || align="left"|American International || align="center"|2 || align="center"|– || 126 || 3,508 || 386 || 282 || 1,045 || 27.8 || 3.1 || 2.2 || 8.3 || align=center|
|-
|align="left" bgcolor="#FFCC00"|+ (#32) || align="center"|F || align="left"|Arizona || align="center"|11 || align="center"|–– || 669 || 22,093 || 2,941 || 1,700 || 9,659 || 33.0 || 4.4 || 2.5 || 14.4 || align=center|
|-
|align="left"| || align="center"|G/F || align="left"|Tennessee || align="center"|2 || align="center"|– || 159 || 5,321 || 567 || 187 || 2,536 || 33.5 || 3.6 || 1.2 || 15.9 || align=center|
|-
|align="left"| || align="center"|C || align="left"|California || align="center"|2 || align="center"|– || 111 || 1,866 || 471 || 71 || 494 || 16.8 || 4.2 || 0.6 || 4.5 || align=center|
|-
|align="left"| || align="center"|C || align="left"|Fresno State || align="center"|1 || align="center"| || 6 || 65 || 14 || 4 || 19 || 10.8 || 2.3 || 0.7 || 3.2 || align=center|
|-
|align="left"||| align="center"|F || align="left"|Oregon State || align="center"|4 || align="center"|– || 148 || 1,735 || 556 || 114 || 687 || 11.7 || 3.8 || 0.8 || 4.6 || align=center|
|-
|align="left"| || align="center"|G || align="left"|Kansas State || align="center"|1 || align="center"| || 79 || 1,246 || 107 || 230 || 486 || 15.8 || 1.4 || 2.9 || 6.2 || align=center|
|-
|align="left"| || align="center"|G || align="left"|USC || align="center"|1 || align="center"| || 3 || 54 || 6 || 2 || 13 || 18.0 || 2.0 || 0.7 || 4.3 || align=center|
|-
|align="left"| || align="center"|C || align="left"|Michigan State || align="center"|1 || align="center"| || 38 || 614 || 211 || 26 || 146 || 16.2 || 5.6 || 0.7 || 3.8 || align=center|
|-
|align="left"| || align="center"|F || align="left"|Duke || align="center"|3 || align="center"|– || 194 || 3,088 || 388 || 140 || 796 || 15.9 || 2.0 || 0.7 || 4.1 || align=center|
|-
|align="left"| || align="center"|G/F || align="left"|Wisconsin || align="center"|5 || align="center"|– || 347 || 8,796 || 1,032 || 471 || 3,223 || 25.3 || 3.0 || 1.4 || 9.3 || align=center|
|-
|align="left"| || align="center"|G || align="left"|Georgetown || align="center"|1 || align="center"| || 53 || 737 || 70 || 101 || 200 || 13.9 || 1.3 || 1.9 || 3.8 || align=center|
|-
|align="left"| || align="center"|G || align="left"|Michigan State || align="center"|5 || align="center"|– || 301 || 6,350 || 561 || 427 || 2,686 || 21.1 || 1.9 || 1.4 || 8.9|| align=center|
|-
|align="left"| || align="center"|G || align="left"|Texas || align="center"|1 || align="center"| || 14 || 191 || 18 || 45 || 51 || 13.6 || 1.3 || 3.2 || 3.6 || align=center|
|-
|align="left"| || align="center"|F || align="left"|Purdue || align="center"|2 || align="center"|– || 34 || 274 || 111 || 15 || 112 || 8.1 || 3.3 || 0.4 || 3.3 || align=center|
|-
|align="left"| || align="center"|F || align="left"|Kansas || align="center"|1 || align="center"| || 37 || 511 || 105 || 42 || 276 || 13.8 || 2.8 || 1.1 || 7.5 || align=center|
|-
|align="left" bgcolor="#FFCC00"|+ || align="center"|G || align="left"|Illinois || align="center"|3 || align="center"|– || 191 || 6,371 || 577 || 662 || 3,920 || 33.4 || 3.0 || 3.5 || 20.5 || align=center|
|}

G

|-
|align="left"| || align="center"|G || align="left"|Elizabeth City State || align="center"|6 || align="center"|– || 414 || 10,702 || 1,093 || 1,878 || 3,299 || 25.9 || 2.6 || 4.5 || 8.0 || align=center|
|-
|align="left"| || align="center"|G || align="left"| COC-Ribeirão Preto || align="center"|1 || align="center"| || 2 || 13 || 0 || 0 || 3 || 6.5 || 0.0 || 0.0 || 1.5 || align=center|
|-
|align="left"| || align="center"|G || align="left"|Rhode Island || align="center"|1 || align="center"| || 19 || 374 || 41 || 63 || 98 || 19.7 || 2.2 || 3.3 || 5.2 || align=center|
|-
|align="left"| || align="center"|F/C || align="left"| FC Barcelona || align="center"|3 || align="center"|– || 168 || 3,769 || 1,247 || 438 || 1,681 || 22.4 || 7.4 || 2.6 || 10.0 || align=center|
|-
|align="left"| || align="center"|F || align="left"|UConn || align="center"|4 || align="center"|– || 256 || 5,892 || 1,426 || 457 || 3,043 || 23.0 || 5.6 || 1.8 || 11.9 || align=center|
|-
|align="left"| || align="center"|G || align="left"|Seton Hall || align="center"|1 || align="center"| || 19 || 58 || 5 || 6 || 21 || 3.1 || 0.3 || 0.3 || 1.1 || align=center|
|-
|align="left"| || align="center"|G || align="left"|Arizona || align="center"|1 || align="center"| || 62 || 685 || 67 || 74 || 152 || 11.0 || 1.1 || 1.2 || 2.5 || align=center|
|-
|align="left"| || align="center"|G || align="left"|Alabama || align="center"|1 || align="center"| || 5 || 18 || 3 || 0 || 2 || 3.6 || 0.6 || 0.0 || 0.4 || align=center|
|-
|align="left"| || align="center"|G/F || align="left"|Virginia || align="center"|1 || align="center"| || 11 || 129 || 38 || 9 || 52 || 11.7 || 3.5 || 0.8 || 4.7 || align=center|
|-
|align="left" bgcolor="#FFFF99"|^ (#44) || align="center"|G/F || align="left"|Eastern Michigan || align="center"|12 || align="center"|– || 899 || 31,115 || 4,841 || 2,523 || 23,602 || 34.6 || 5.4 || 2.8 || bgcolor="#CFECEC"|26.3 || align=center|
|-
|align="left" bgcolor="#FFFF99"|^ || align="center"|C || align="left"|Jacksonville || align="center"|5 || align="center"|– || 380 || 12,387 || 3,671 || 579 || 6,127 || 32.6 || 9.7 || 1.5 || 16.1 || align=center|
|-
|align="left" bgcolor="#FFFF99"|^ (#20) || align="center"|G || align="left"| Virtus Bologna || align="center"|16 || align="center"|– || 1,057 || 26,859 || 3,697 || 4,001 || 14,043 || 25.4 || 3.5 || 3.8 || 13.3 || align=center|
|-
|align="left"| || align="center"|G || align="left"|Georgia Tech || align="center"|1 || align="center"| || 7 || 68 || 11 || 4 || 25 || 9.7 || 1.6 || 0.6 || 3.6 || align=center|
|-
|align="left"| || align="center"|G || align="left"|Houston || align="center"|1 || align="center"| || 10 || 51 || 3 || 3 || 12 || 5.1 || 0.3 || 0.3 || 1.2 || align=center|
|-
|align="left"| || align="center"|F || align="left"|Kansas || align="center"|1 || align="center"| || 19 || 320 || 83 || 3 || 187 || 16.8 || 4.4 || 0.2 || 9.8 || align=center|
|-
|align="left"| || align="center"|F || align="left"|Clemson || align="center"|1 || align="center"| || 3 || 24 || 5 || 0 || 10 || 8.0 || 1.7 || 0.0 || 3.3 || align=center|
|-
|align="left"| || align="center"|G/F || align="left"|North Carolina || align="center"|8 || align="center"|– || 520 || 13,438 || 1,835 || 866 || 4,715 || 25.8 || 3.5 || 1.7 || 9.1 || align=center|
|-
|align="left"| || align="center"|F || align="left"|Alabama || align="center"|1 || align="center"| || 4 || 25 || 6 || 0 || 8 || 6.3 || 1.5 || 0.0 || 2.0 || align=center|
|-
|align="left"| || align="center"|F/C || align="left"|Louisiana Tech || align="center"|2 || align="center"|– || 139 || 2,773 || 658 || 182 || 1,047 || 19.9 || 4.7 || 1.3 || 7.5 || align=center|
|-
|align="left"| || align="center"|F/C || align="left"|UNLV || align="center"|3 || align="center"|– || 161 || 2,428 || 726 || 107 || 863 || 15.1 || 4.5 || 0.7 || 5.4 || align=center|
|-
|align="left"| || align="center"|F/C || align="left"|UCLA || align="center"|5 || align="center"|– || 293 || 7,663 || 2,073 || 531 || 2,372 || 26.2 || 7.1 || 1.8 || 8.1 || align=center|
|-
|align="left"| || align="center"|F/C || align="left"|Western Michigan || align="center"|4 || align="center"|– || 240 || 5,157 || 1,254 || 639 || 1,283 || 21.5 || 5.2 || 2.7 || 5.3 || align=center|
|-
|align="left"| || align="center"|C || align="left"|Washington || align="center"|2 || align="center"|– || 74 || 1,087 || 339 || 91 || 416 || 14.7 || 4.6 || 1.2 || 5.6 || align=center|
|}

H

|-
|align="left" bgcolor="#FFFF99"|^ || align="center"|G/F || align="left"|Kentucky || align="center"|3 || align="center"|– || 94 || 2,343 || 439 || 404 || 1,423 || 24.9 || 4.7 || 4.3 || 15.1 || align=center|
|-
|align="left"| || align="center"|G || align="left"|Vanderbilt || align="center"|2 || align="center"|– || 69 || 882 || 112 || 131 || 354 || 12.8 || 1.6 || 1.9 || 5.1 || align=center|
|-
|align="left"| || align="center"|G || align="left"|Oregon || align="center"|2 || align="center"|– || 62 || 472 || 77 || 29 || 149 || 7.6 || 1.2 || 0.5 || 2.4 || align=center|
|-
|align="left"| || align="center"|F || align="left"|Tennessee || align="center"|1 || align="center"| || 10 || 44 || 10 || 0 || 25 || 4.4 || 1.0 || 0.0 || 2.5 || align=center|
|-
|align="left"| || align="center"|F/C || align="left"|UCLA || align="center"|2 || align="center"|– || 59 || 211 || 51 || 3 || 132 || 3.6 || 0.9 || 0.1 || 2.2 || align=center|
|-
|align="left"| || align="center"|G/F || align="left"|Utah State || align="center"|2 || align="center"|– || 84 || 1,125 || 210 || 121 || 450 || 13.4 || 2.5 || 1.4 || 5.4 || align=center|
|-
|align="left"| || align="center"|G || align="left"|North Texas || align="center"|4 || align="center"|– || 292 || 8,297 || 810 || 1,092 || 3,781 || 28.4 || 2.8 || 3.7 || 12.9 || align=center|
|-
|align="left"| || align="center"|G/F || align="left"|Kansas || align="center"|1 || align="center"| || 1 || 8 || 0 || 1 || 4 || 8.0 || 0.0 || 1.0 || 4.0 || align=center|
|-
|align="left"| || align="center"|G || align="left"|Syracuse || align="center"|2 || align="center"| || 63 || 752 || 92 || 93 || 203 || 11.9 || 1.5 || 1.5 || 3.2 || align=center|
|-
|align="left"| || align="center"|C || align="left"|Idaho State || align="center"|1 || align="center"| || 9 || 75 || 17 || 4 || 23 || 8.3 || 1.9 || 0.4 || 2.6 || align=center|
|-
|align="left"| || align="center"|G || align="left"| Geelong Supercats || align="center"|1 || align="center"| || 6 || 72 || 4 || 5 || 22 || 12.0 || 0.7 || 0.8 || 3.7 || align=center|
|-
|align="left"| || align="center"|F || align="left"| Estudiantes || align="center"|1 || align="center"|– || 5 || 51 || 15 || 3 || 7 || 10.2 || 3.0 || 0.6 || 1.4 || align=center|
|-
|align="left"| || align="center"|F || align="left"|Houston || align="center"|3 || align="center"|– || 177 || 2,746 || 512 || 88 || 852 || 15.5 || 2.9 || 0.5 || 4.8 || align=center|
|-
|align="left"| || align="center"|F || align="left"|Fresno State || align="center"|1 || align="center"| || 11 || 128 || 24 || 12 || 47 || 11.6 || 2.2 || 1.1 || 4.3 || align=center|
|-
|align="left"| || align="center"|G/F || align="left"|Michigan || align="center"|2 || align="center"|– || 56 || 500 || 71 || 39 || 240 || 8.9 || 1.3 || 0.7 || 4.3 || align=center|
|-
|align="left"| || align="center"|F/C || align="left"|Kansas || align="center"|1 || align="center"| || 33 || 1,220 || 328 || 90 || 478 || 37.0 || 9.9 || 2.7 || 14.5 || align=center|
|-
|align="left"| || align="center"|G || align="left"|IUPUI || align="center"|3 || align="center"|– || 231 || 5,694 || 562 || 555 || 2,286 || 24.6 || 2.4 || 2.4 || 9.9 || align=center|
|-
|align="left"| || align="center"|F || align="left"|West Texas A&M || align="center"|2 || align="center"| || 130 || 2,682 || 578 || 156 || 964 || 20.6 || 4.4 || 1.2 || 7.4 || align=center|
|-
|align="left"| || align="center"|G || align="left"|Villanova || align="center"|1 || align="center"| || 14 || 95 || 7 || 11 || 16 || 6.8 || 0.5 || 0.8 || 1.1 || align=center|
|-
|align="left"| || align="center"|G || align="left"|SMU || align="center"|1 || align="center"| || 46 || 554 || 78 || 73 || 176 || 12.0 || 1.7 || 1.6 || 3.8 || align=center|
|-
|align="left"| || align="center"|F || align="left"|SMU || align="center"|1 || align="center"| || 56 || 720 || 216 || 29 || 316 || 12.9 || 3.9 || 0.5 || 5.6 || align=center|
|-
|align="left"| || align="center"|F || align="left"|Alabama || align="center"|5 || align="center"|– || 332 || 5,575 || 1,120 || 384 || 1,544 || 16.8 || 3.4 || 1.2 || 4.7 || align=center|
|-
|align="left"| || align="center"|F || align="left"|DePaul || align="center"|1 || align="center"| || 7 || 69 || 9 || 1 || 26 || 9.9 || 1.3 || 0.1 || 3.7 || align=center|
|-
|align="left"| || align="center"|G/F || align="left"|Loyola (IL) || align="center"|1 || align="center"| || 68 || 866 || 113 || 61 || 356 || 12.7 || 1.7 || 0.9 || 5.2 || align=center|
|}

I to J

|-
|align="left"| || align="center"|F || align="left"|Virginia || align="center"|2 || align="center"|– || 99 || 1,847 || 407 || 166 || 572 || 18.7 || 4.1 || 1.7 || 5.8 || align=center|
|-
|align="left"| || align="center"|G || align="left"|Cleveland State || align="center"|1 || align="center"| || 3 || 25 || 4 || 6 || 7 || 8.3 || 1.3 || 2.0 || 2.3 || align=center|
|-
|align="left"| || align="center"|G/F || align="left"|Georgetown || align="center"|4 || align="center"|– || 226 || 4,892 || 502 || 330 || 1,575 || 21.6 || 2.2 || 1.5 || 7.0 || align=center|
|-
|align="left"| || align="center"|G/F || align="left"|Butler CC || align="center"|4 || align="center"|–– || 179 || 4,056 || 548 || 315 || 1,563 || 22.7 || 3.1 || 1.8 || 8.7 || align=center|
|-
|align="left"| || align="center"|G/F || align="left"|Texas || align="center"|1 || align="center"| || 5 || 50 || 12 || 3 || 6 || 10.0 || 2.4 || 0.6 || 1.2 || align=center|
|-
|align="left"| || align="center"|G || align="left"|Robert Morris (IL) || align="center"|2 || align="center"| || 5 || 42 || 8 || 2 || 9 || 8.4 || 1.6 || 0.4 || 1.8 || align=center|
|-
|align="left"| || align="center"|F || align="left"|Arizona || align="center"|3 || align="center"|– || 203 || 6,147 || 809 || 320 || 2,264 || 30.3 || 4.0 || 1.6 || 11.2 || align=center|
|-
|align="left"| (#6) || align="center"|G || align="left"|Southern || align="center"|10 || align="center"|–– || 644 || 20,009 || 1,309 || 4,474 || 6,486 || 31.1 || 2.0 || 6.9 || 10.1 || align=center|
|-
|align="left"| || align="center"|F || align="left"|Cincinnati || align="center"|1 || align="center"| || 5 || 28 || 1 || 1 || 17 || 5.6 || 0.2 || 0.2 || 3.4 || align=center|
|-
|align="left"| || align="center"|C || align="left"|Tennessee State || align="center"|1 || align="center"| || 8 || 159 || 48 || 8 || 52 || 19.9 || 6.0 || 1.0 || 6.5 || align=center|
|-
|align="left"| || align="center"|C || align="left"|Stephen F. Austin || align="center"|1 || align="center"| || 67 || 1,477 || 464 || 59 || 317 || 22.0 || 6.9 || 0.9 || 4.7 || align=center|
|-
|align="left"| || align="center"|F/C || align="left"|Dillard || align="center"|2 || align="center"|– || 157 || 3,513 || 1,056 || 171 || 633 || 22.4 || 6.7 || 1.1 || 4.0 || align=center|
|-
|align="left" bgcolor="#CCFFCC"|x || align="center"|F || align="left"|Kentucky || align="center"|3 || align="center"|–  || 161 || 4,661 || 926 || 294 || 2,313 || 29.0 || 5.8 || 1.8 || 14.4 || align=center|
|-
|align="left"| || align="center"|F || align="left"|Tulane || align="center"|1 || align="center"| || 2 || 15 || 3 || 0 || 0 || 7.5 || 1.5 || 0.0 || 0.0 || align=center|
|-
|align="left"| || align="center"|F/C || align="left"|Tennessee || align="center"|2 || align="center"|– || 100 || 2,220 || 495 || 98 || 1,028 || 22.2 || 5.0 || 1.0 || 10.3 || align=center|
|-
|align="left"| || align="center"|F/C || align="left"|Oregon State || align="center"|1 || align="center"| || 71 || 1,828 || 462 || 95 || 983 || 25.7 || 6.5 || 1.3 || 13.8 || align=center|
|-
|align="left"| || align="center"|F/C || align="left"|Murray State || align="center"|1 || align="center"| || 10 || 123 || 19 || 15 || 45 || 12.3 || 1.9 || 1.5 || 4.5 || align=center|
|-
|align="left"| || align="center"|G || align="left"|Fresno State || align="center"|1 || align="center"|– || 3 || 20 || 6 || 5 || 6 || 17.7 || 2.0 || 1.7 || 2.0 || align=center|
|-
|align="left"| || align="center"|G || align="left"|Baylor || align="center"|1 || align="center"| || 60 || 1,350 || 182 || 145 || 478 || 22.5 || 3.0 || 2.4 || 8.0 || align=center|
|-
|align="left"| || align="center"|F/C || align="left"|Wake Forest || align="center"|1 || align="center"| || 7 || 54 || 16 || 1 || 7 || 7.7 || 2.3 || 0.1 || 1.0 || align=center|
|-
|align="left"| || align="center"|G/F || align="left"|UNLV || align="center"|1 || align="center"| || 49 || 744 || 95 || 66 || 286 || 15.2 || 1.9 || 1.3 || 5.8 || align=center|
|-
|align="left"| || align="center"|F || align="left"|Washington || align="center"|1 || align="center"| || 3 || 20 || 2 || 1 || 2 || 6.7 || 0.7 || 0.3 || 0.7 || align=center|
|-
|align="left"| || align="center"|F/C || align="left"|Albany State || align="center"|1 || align="center"| || 72 || 885 || 230 || 20 || 173 || 12.3 || 3.2 || 0.3 || 2.4 || align=center|
|-
|align="left"| || align="center"|F || align="left"|Notre Dame || align="center"|2 || align="center"|– || 159 || 3,632 || 856 || 221 || 1,366 || 22.8 || 5.4 || 1.4 || 8.6 || align=center|
|-
|align="left"| || align="center"|F/C || align="left"|Nevada || align="center"|3 || align="center"|– || 127 || 2,714 || 688 || 123 || 1,223 || 21.4 || 5.4 || 1.0 || 9.6 || align=center|
|-
|align="left"| || align="center"|G/F || align="left"|Toledo || align="center"|1 || align="center"| || 53 || 1,254 || 178 || 163 || 530 || 23.7 || 3.4 || 3.1 || 10.0 || align=center|
|-
|align="left"| || align="center"|G || align="left"|Oregon || align="center"|2 || align="center"| || 7 || 76 || 6 || 6 || 22 || 10.9 || 0.9 || 0.9 || 3.1 || align=center|
|-
|align="left"| || align="center"|F/C || align="left"|Cal State Fullerton || align="center"|1 || align="center"| || 67 || 888 || 238 || 56 || 245 || 13.3 || 3.6 || 0.8 || 3.7 || align=center|
|-
|align="left" bgcolor="#FFCC00"|+ || align="center"|F/C || align="left"|Memphis || align="center"|6 || align="center"|– || 391 || 13,687 || 3,137 || 1,217 || 6,466 || 35.0 || 8.0 || 3.1 || 16.5 || align=center|
|-
|align="left"| || align="center"|F || align="left"|St. John's || align="center"|1 || align="center"| || 7 || 92 || 16 || 7 || 26 || 13.1 || 2.3 || 1.0 || 3.7 || align=center|
|-
|align="left" bgcolor="#FFCC00"|+ || align="center"|G/F || align="left"|Oregon || align="center"|2 || align="center"|– || 97 || 3,550 || 363 || 272 || 1,758 || 36.6 || 3.7 || 2.8 || 18.1 || align=center|
|-
|align="left" bgcolor="#CCFFCC"|x || align="center"|G || align="left"|Duke || align="center"|2 || align="center"|– || 106 || 1,417 || 176 || 272 || 507 || 13.4 || 1.7 || 2.6 || 4.8 || align=center|
|-
|align="left"| || align="center"|G || align="left"|Texas || align="center"|4 || align="center"|– || 204 || 3,034 || 376 || 389 || 1,062 || 14.9 || 1.8 || 1.9 || 5.2 || align=center|
|}

K to L

|-
|align="left"| || align="center"|G || align="left"|North Carolina || align="center"|5 || align="center"|– || 264 || 4,449 || 369 || 795 || 1,703 || 16.9 || 1.4 || 3.0 || 6.5 || align=center|
|-
|align="left"| || align="center"|F/C || align="left"|Notre Dame || align="center"|1 || align="center"| || 10 || 59 || 8 || 2 || 4 || 5.9 || 0.8 || 0.2 || 0.4 || align=center|
|-
|align="left"| || align="center"|F/C || align="left"|TCU || align="center"|3 || align="center"|– || 211 || 4,702 || 1,362 || 223 || 1,882 || 22.3 || 6.5 || 1.1 || 8.9 || align=center|
|-
|align="left" bgcolor="#FFCC00"|+ || align="center"|F || align="left"|Memphis || align="center"|5 || align="center"|– || 399 || 14,470 || 4,114 || 1,214 || 8,248 || 36.3 || 10.3 || 3.0 || 20.7 || align=center|
|-
|align="left"| || align="center"|G || align="left"|Arizona || align="center"|4 || align="center"|– || 206 || 2,604 || 158 || 188 || 761 || 12.6 || 0.8 || 0.9 || 3.7 || align=center|
|-
|align="left"| || align="center"|F || align="left"|Longwood || align="center"|2 || align="center"|– || 117 || 2,009 || 355 || 110 || 466 || 17.2 || 3.0 || 0.9 || 4.0 || align=center|
|-
|align="left"| || align="center"|F || align="left"|Oklahoma Baptist || align="center"|1 || align="center"| || 26 || 212 || 40 || 19 || 82 || 8.2 || 1.5 || 0.7 || 3.2 || align=center|
|-
|align="left"| || align="center"|G/F || align="left"|Maryland || align="center"|1 || align="center"| || 46 || 791 || 140 || 79 || 327 || 17.2 || 3.0 || 1.7 || 7.1 || align=center|
|-
|align="left"| || align="center"|F || align="left"|Nicholls || align="center"|1 || align="center"| || 19 || 63 || 14 || 4 || 23 || 3.3 || 0.7 || 0.2 || 1.2 || align=center|
|-
|align="left"| || align="center"|G/F || align="left"|Pittsburgh || align="center"|1 || align="center"| || 52 || 611 || 96 || 59 || 311 || 11.8 || 1.8 || 1.1 || 6.0 || align=center|
|-
|align="left"| || align="center"|G || align="left"|Dayton || align="center"|1 || align="center"| || 64 || 1,430 || 103 || 197 || 593 || 22.3 || 1.6 || 3.1 || 9.3 || align=center|
|-
|align="left"| || align="center"|F/C || align="left"|Montana || align="center"|1 || align="center"| || 68 || 1,004 || 239 || 85 || 451 || 14.8 || 3.5 || 1.3 || 6.6 || align=center|
|-
|align="left"| || align="center"|F || align="left"|Vermont || align="center"|1 || align="center"|– || 2 || 8 || 1 || 2 || 0 || 4.0 || 0.5 || 1.0 || 0.0 || align=center|
|-
|align="left"| || align="center"|F/C || align="left"|USC || align="center"|1 || align="center"| || 21 || 271 || 51 || 13 || 65 || 12.9 || 2.4 || 0.6 || 3.1 || align=center|
|-
|align="left"| || align="center"|G/F || align="left"|Virginia || align="center"|1 || align="center"| || 30 || 620 || 79 || 53 || 332 || 20.7 || 2.6 || 1.8 || 11.1 || align=center|
|-
|align="left" bgcolor="#CCFFCC"|x || align="center"|C || align="left"|Saint Mary's || align="center"|1 || align="center"| || 54 || 589 || 138 || 45 || 265 || 10.9 || 2.6 || 0.8 || 4.9 || align=center|
|-
|align="left"| || align="center"|G || align="left"|Kansas || align="center"|1 || align="center"| || 2 || 10 || 2 || 0 || 2 || 5.0 || 1.0 || 0.0 || 1.0 || align=center|
|-
|align="left" bgcolor="#CCFFCC"|x || align="center"|G || align="left"|Indiana || align="center"|1 || align="center"|– || 4 || 43 || 4 || 2 || 11 || 10.8 || 1.0 || 0.5 || 2.8 || align=center|
|-
|align="left"| || align="center"|G || align="left"| Flamengo || align="center"|1 || align="center"| || 18 || 174 || 10 || 28 || 59 || 9.7 || 0.6 || 1.6 || 3.3 || align=center|
|-
|align="left"| || align="center"|F/C || align="left"| Partizan || align="center"|1 || align="center"| || 55 || 534 || 171 || 41 || 226 || 9.7 || 3.1 || 0.7 || 4.1 || align=center|
|-
|align="left"| || align="center"|G || align="left"|USC || align="center"|1 || align="center"| || 41 || 498 || 32 || 108 || 182 || 12.1 || 0.8 || 2.6 || 4.4 || align=center|
|-
|align="left"| || align="center"|F/C || align="left"|Niagara || align="center"|3 || align="center"|– || 151 || 4,975 || 1,763 || 175 || 2,484 || 32.9 || 11.7 || 1.2 || 16.5 || align=center|
|-
|align="left"| || align="center"|G || align="left"|North Carolina || align="center"|1 || align="center"| || 4 || 32 || 4 || 3 || 6 || 8.0 || 1.0 || 0.8 || 1.5 || align=center|
|-
|align="left"| || align="center"|F || align="left"|Florida || align="center"|1 || align="center"| || 79 || 1,477 || 441 || 124 || 576 || 18.7 || 5.6 || 1.6 || 7.3 || align=center|
|-
|align="left" bgcolor="#FFCC00"|+ || align="center"|F || align="left"|San Diego State || align="center"|7 || align="center"|– || 407 || 12,364 || 2,511 || 924 || 6,654 || 30.4 || 6.2 || 2.3 || 16.3 || align=center|
|-
|align="left"| || align="center"|G || align="left"|Florida || align="center"|1 || align="center"| || 7 || 99 || 7 || 7 || 34 || 14.1 || 1.0 || 1.0 || 4.9 || align=center|
|-
|align="left"| || align="center"|F || align="left"|South Dakota State || align="center"|1 || align="center"| || 3 || 14 || 4 || 1 || 2 || 4.7 || 1.3 || 0.3 || 0.7 || align=center|
|-
|align="left"| || align="center"|F || align="left"|Kansas || align="center"|3 || align="center"|– || 170 || 2,205 || 466 || 143 || 731 || 13.0 || 2.7 || 0.8 || 4.3 || align=center|
|-
|align="left"| || align="center"|C || align="left"|Auburn || align="center"|1 || align="center"| || 2 || 14 || 3 || 0 || 4 || 7.0 || 1.5 || 0.0 || 2.0 || align=center|
|-
|align="left"| || align="center"|F/C || align="left"|Iowa || align="center"|2 || align="center"| || 41 || 375 || 45 || 22 || 126 || 9.1 || 1.1 || 0.5 || 3.1 || align=center|
|-
|align="left"| || align="center"|F || align="left"|Oregon || align="center"|1 || align="center"| || 12 || 64 || 24 || 9 || 29 || 5.3 || 2.0 || 0.8 || 2.4 || align=center|
|-
|align="left"| || align="center"|G || align="left"|Maryland || align="center"|1 || align="center"| || 63 || 1,807 || 180 || 673 || 689 || 28.7 || 2.9 || bgcolor="#CFECEC"|10.7 || 10.9 || align=center|
|-
|align="left"| || align="center"|F || align="left"|Kentucky || align="center"|2 || align="center"|– || 86 || 1,629 || 447 || 83 || 519 || 18.9 || 2.9 || 1.0 || 6.0 || align=center|
|}

M

|-
|align="left"| || align="center"|G/F || align="left"|Houston || align="center"|1 || align="center"| || 40 || 267 || 48 || 15 || 142 || 6.7 || 1.2 || 0.4 || 3.6 || align=center|
|-
|align="left"| || align="center"|C || align="left"| STB Le Havre || align="center"|2 || align="center"| || 32 || 188 || 57 || 3 || 122 || 5.9 || 1.8 || 0.1 || 3.8 || align=center|
|-
|align="left" bgcolor="#FFFF99"|^ || align="center"|F/C || align="left"|Petersburg HS (VA) || align="center"|1 || align="center"| || 17 || 149 || 46 || 6 || 49 || 8.8 || 2.7 || 0.4 || 2.9 || align=center|
|-
|align="left"| || align="center"|F || align="left"|Davidson || align="center"|1 || align="center"| || 9 || 63 || 15 || 3 || 20 || 7.0 || 1.7 || 0.3 || 2.2 || align=center|
|-
|align="left"| || align="center"|C || align="left"| Vršac || align="center"|1 || align="center"| || 54 || 508 || 194 || 21 || 297 || 9.4 || 3.6 || 0.4 || 5.5 || align=center|
|-
|align="left"| || align="center"|F/C || align="left"|California || align="center"|2 || align="center"|– || 48 || 425 || 99 || 15 || 157 || 8.9 || 2.1 || 0.3 || 3.3 || align=center|
|-
|align="left"| || align="center"|G || align="left"|Western Carolina || align="center"|1 || align="center"| || 16 || 261 || 29 || 12 || 99 || 16.3 || 1.8 || 0.8 || 6.2 || align=center|
|-
|align="left"| || align="center"|G || align="left"|Virginia || align="center"|2 || align="center"|– || 161 || 4,011 || 413 || 310 || 1,470 || 24.9 || 2.6 || 1.9 || 9.1 || align=center|
|-
|align="left"| || align="center"|F || align="left"|Maryland || align="center"|3 || align="center"|– || 97 || 869 || 221 || 18 || 280 || 9.0 || 2.3 || 0.2 || 2.9 || align=center|
|-
|align="left"| || align="center"|G || align="left"|Wisconsin || align="center"|1 || align="center"| || 75 || 1,853 || 131 || 476 || 817 || 24.7 || 1.7 || 6.3 || 10.9 || align=center|
|-
|align="left"| || align="center"|G || align="left"|Florida || align="center"|3 || align="center"|– || 200 || 5,251 || 502 || 600 || 2,196 || 26.3 || 2.5 || 3.0 || 11.0 || align=center|
|-
|align="left"| || align="center"|G || align="left"|Detroit Mercy || align="center"|1 || align="center"| || 31 || 256 || 31 || 33 || 68 || 8.3 || 1.0 || 1.1 || 2.2 || align=center|
|-
|align="left"| || align="center"|F/C || align="left"|Marquette || align="center"|1 || align="center"| || 27 || 153 || 36 || 4 || 52 || 5.7 || 1.3 || 0.1 || 1.9 || align=center|
|-
|align="left" bgcolor="#CCFFCC"|x || align="center"|F || align="left"|Creighton || align="center"|1 || align="center"| || 51 || 1,223 || 115 || 64 || 578 || 24.0 || 2.3 || 1.3 || 11.3 || align=center|
|-
|align="left"| || align="center"|F/C || align="left"|Alabama || align="center"|2 || align="center"|– || 150 || 3,004 || 850 || 167 || 836 || 20.0 || 5.7 || 1.1 || 5.6 || align=center|
|-
|align="left"| || align="center"|F/C || align="left"|Utah || align="center"|1 || align="center"| || 24 || 181 || 57 || 17 || 75 || 7.5 || 2.4 || 0.7 || 3.1 || align=center|
|-
|align="left"| || align="center"|C || align="left"|Creighton || align="center"|2 || align="center"|– || 44 || 746 || 224 || 8 || 305 || 17.0 || 5.1 || 0.2 || 6.9 || align=center|
|-
|align="left"| || align="center"|G/F || align="left"|North Carolina A&T || align="center"|2 || align="center"| || 85 || 2,468 || 317 || 272 || 1,035 || 29.0 || 3.7 || 3.2 || 12.2 || align=center|
|-
|align="left"| || align="center"|F || align="left"|Loyola Marymount || align="center"|1 || align="center"| || 6 || 42 || 7 || 1 || 17 || 7.0 || 1.2 || 0.2 || 2.8 || align=center|
|-
|align="left"| || align="center"|F/C || align="left"|California || align="center"|2 || align="center"|– || 82 || 1,100 || 334 || 31 || 421 || 13.4 || 4.1 || 0.4 || 5.1 || align=center|
|-
|align="left"| || align="center"|F || align="left"|George Washington || align="center"|1 || align="center"| || 3 || 20 || 10 || 0 || 15 || 6.7 || 3.3 || 0.0 || 5.0 || align=center|
|-
|align="left"| || align="center"|G/F || align="left"|Kentucky || align="center"|1 || align="center"| || 39 || 516 || 49 || 22 || 195 || 13.2 || 1.3 || 0.6 || 5.0 || align=center|
|-
|align="left"| || align="center"|F || align="left"|USC || align="center"|2 || align="center"|– || 47 || 250 || 69 || 23 || 109 || 5.3 || 1.5 || 0.5 || 2.3 || align=center|
|-
|align="left"| || align="center"|G || align="left"|Utah || align="center"|1 || align="center"| || 13 || 181 || 27 || 29 || 56 || 13.9 || 2.1 || 2.2 || 4.3 || align=center|
|-
|align="left"| || align="center"|F || align="left"|Cincinnati || align="center"|1 || align="center"| || 2 || 8 || 5 || 1 || 4 || 4.0 || 2.5 || 0.5 || 2.0 || align=center|
|-
|align="left"| || align="center"|G || align="left"|Saint Mary's || align="center"|10 || align="center"|– || 665 || 13,846 || 1,181 || 1,597 || 6,218 || 20.8 || 1.8 || 2.4 || 9.4 || align=center|
|-
|align="left"| || align="center"|F || align="left"|Auburn || align="center"|7 || align="center"|– || 488 || 15,992 || 2,683 || 679 || 9,799 || 32.8 || 5.5 || 1.4 || 20.1 || align=center|
|-
|align="left"| || align="center"|F || align="left"|Purdue || align="center"|1 || align="center"| || 2 || 33 || 3 || 1 || 5 || 16.5 || 1.5 || 0.5 || 2.5 || align=center|
|-
|align="left"| || align="center"|C || align="left"|Kentucky || align="center"|2 || align="center"|– || 103 || 1,803 || 565 || 48 || 635 || 17.5 || 5.5 || 0.5 || 6.2 || align=center|
|-
|align="left"| || align="center"|F/C || align="left"|Saint Louis || align="center"|2 || align="center"|– || 93 || 2,506 || 924 || 114 || 1,219 || 26.9 || 9.9 || 1.2 || 13.1 || align=center|
|-
|align="left"| (#00) || align="center"|G || align="left"|Texas || align="center"|9 || align="center"|– || 519 || 13,420 || 1,546 || 3,865 || 4,890 || 25.9 || 3.0 || 7.4 || 9.4 || align=center|
|-
|align="left"| || align="center"|G || align="left"|Molloy || align="center"|1 || align="center"|– || 3 || 16 || 2 || 2 || 2 || 5.3 || 0.7 || 0.7 || 0.7 || align=center|
|-
|align="left"| || align="center"|F || align="left"|Seton Hall || align="center"|1 || align="center"| || 26 || 221 || 64 || 19 || 85 || 8.5 || 2.5 || 0.7 || 3.3 || align=center|
|-
|align="left"| || align="center"|F/C || align="left"| Benetton Treviso || align="center"|1 || align="center"| || 3 || 13 || 3 || 1 || 6 || 4.3 || 1.0 || 0.3 || 2.0 || align=center|
|-
|align="left" bgcolor="#FBCEB1"|* || align="center"|G || align="left"|Washington || align="center"|5 || align="center"|– || 320 || 8,257 || 1,920 || 1,540 || 3,993 || 25.8 || 6.0 || 4.8 || 12.5 || align=center|
|-
|align="left"| || align="center"|G/F || align="left"|Little Rock || align="center"|2 || align="center"| || 30 || 431 || 55 || 62 || 141 || 14.4 || 1.8 || 2.1 || 4.7 || align=center|
|}

N to O

|-
|align="left" bgcolor="#FFCC00"|+ || align="center"|C || align="left"|UCLA || align="center"|2 || align="center"|– || 140 || 4,714 || 2,123 || 209 || 2,075 || 33.7 || 15.2 || 1.5 || 14.8 || align=center|
|-
|align="left"| || align="center"|F || align="left"|Louisiana–Monroe || align="center"|1 || align="center"| || 10 || 185 || 32 || 11 || 85 || 18.5 || 3.2 || 1.1 || 8.5 || align=center|
|-
|align="left"| || align="center"|G || align="left"|Towson || align="center"|3 || align="center"|– || 204 || 4,375 || 457 || 342 || 1,985 || 21.4 || 2.2 || 1.7 || 9.7 || align=center|
|-
|align="left"| || align="center"|F || align="left"|Kansas State || align="center"|2 || align="center"|– || 128 || 1,817 || 506 || 132 || 365 || 14.2 || 4.0 || 1.0 || 2.9 || align=center|
|-
|align="left"| || align="center"|G || align="left"|Washington || align="center"|1 || align="center"| || 4 || 57 || 7 || 3 || 18 || 14.3 || 1.8 || 0.8 || 4.5 || align=center|
|-
|align="left"| || align="center"|C || align="left"| Virtus Bologna || align="center"|3 || align="center"|– || 232 || 5,653 || 1,401 || 218 || 1,482 || 24.4 || 6.0 || 0.9 || 6.4 || align=center|
|-
|align="left"| || align="center"|F/C || align="left"|Drake || align="center"|2 || align="center"|– || 103 || 3,897 || 952 || 283 || 1,798 || 37.8 || 9.2 || 2.7 || 17.5 || align=center|
|-
|align="left"| || align="center"|C || align="left"|NC State || align="center"|1 || align="center"| || 1 || 1 || 1 || 0 || 3 || 1.0 || 1.0 || 0.0 || 3.0 || align=center|
|-
|align="left"| || align="center"|F || align="left"|Miami (OH) || align="center"|1 || align="center"| || 27 || 184 || 35 || 6 || 54 || 6.8 || 1.3 || 0.2 || 2.0 || align=center|
|-
|align="left"| || align="center"|G || align="left"|Northwestern Oklahoma State || align="center"|1 || align="center"| || 3 || 36 || 4 || 1 || 13 || 12.0 || 1.3 || 0.3 || 4.3 || align=center|
|-
|align="left"| || align="center"|C || align="left"|Saint Louis || align="center"|1 || align="center"| || 33 || 524 || 155 || 24 || 121 || 15.9 || 4.7 || 0.7 || 3.7 || align=center|
|-
|align="left"| || align="center"|F/C || align="left"|Arizona State || align="center"|1 || align="center"| || 72 || 919 || 153 || 53 || 316 || 12.8 || 2.1 || 0.7 || 4.4 || align=center|
|-
|align="left"| || align="center"|C || align="left"|Jackson State || align="center"|1 || align="center"| || 17 || 189 || 43 || 6 || 40 || 11.1 || 2.5 || 0.4 || 2.4 || align=center|
|-
|align="left"| || align="center"|F || align="left"|Marquette || align="center"|1 || align="center"| || 23 || 197 || 23 || 3 || 93 || 8.6 || 1.0 || 0.1 || 4.0 || align=center|
|-
|align="left"| || align="center"|C || align="left"|Liberty || align="center"|1 || align="center"| || 23 || 84 || 24 || 3 || 31 || 3.7 || 1.0 || 0.1 || 1.3 || align=center|
|-
|align="left"| || align="center"|F/C || align="left"| Atenas de Cordoba || align="center"|4 || align="center"|– || 274 || 4,176 || 1,063 || 249 || 991 || 15.2 || 3.9 || 0.9 || 3.6 || align=center|
|-
|align="left"| || align="center"|F || align="left"|Minnesota || align="center"|7 || align="center"|– || 536 || 13,845 || 3,004 || 1,391 || 5,626 || 25.8 || 5.6 || 2.6 || 10.5 || align=center|
|-
|align="left"| || align="center"|G || align="left"|Arizona || align="center"|1 || align="center"| || 4 || 39 || 2 || 7 || 8 || 9.8 || 0.5 || 1.8 || 2.0 || align=center|
|-
|align="left"| || align="center"|F || align="left"|Oral Roberts || align="center"|1 || align="center"| || 7 || 31 || 4 || 1 || 9 || 4.4 || 0.6 || 0.1 || 1.3 || align=center|
|-
|align="left"| || align="center"|F/C || align="left"|South Carolina || align="center"|1 || align="center"| || 39 || 538 || 155 || 41 || 226 || 13.8 || 4.0 || 1.1 || 5.8 || align=center|
|}

P to Q

|-
|align="left" bgcolor="#FFCC00"|+ || align="center"|G || align="left"| Paris Basket Racing || align="center"|17 || align="center"|– || 1,198 || 37,276 || 3,313 || bgcolor="#CFECEC"|6,829 || 18,943 || 31.1 || 2.8 || 5.7 || 15.8 || align=center|
|-
|align="left"| || align="center"|F/C || align="left"|Duke || align="center"|1 || align="center"| || 42 || 234 || 58 || 10 || 63 || 5.6 || 1.4 || 0.2 || 1.5 || align=center|
|-
|align="left"| || align="center"|F || align="left"| Partizan || align="center"|1 || align="center"| || 28 || 181 || 30 || 10 || 72 || 6.5 || 1.1 || 0.4 || 2.6 || align=center|
|-
|align="left"| || align="center"|G || align="left"|Illinois || align="center"|1 || align="center"| || 64 || 576 || 68 || 37 || 147 || 9.0 || 1.1 || 0.6 || 2.3 || align=center|
|-
|align="left" bgcolor="#FFCC00"|+ || align="center"|F/C || align="left"|St. John's || align="center"|6 || align="center"|– || 378 || 11,591 || 3,203 || 1,076 || 5,297 || 30.7 || 8.5 || 2.8 || 14.0 || align=center|
|-
|align="left"| || align="center"|G || align="left"|Notre Dame || align="center"|2 || align="center"|– || 127 || 1,717 || 101 || 364 || 628 || 13.5 || 0.8 || 2.9 || 4.9 || align=center|
|-
|align="left"| || align="center"|G || align="left"|Mississippi State || align="center"|1 || align="center"| || 52 || 628 || 183 || 33 || 180 || 12.1 || 3.5 || 0.6 || 3.5 || align=center|
|-
|align="left"| || align="center"|C || align="left"|Louisiana Tech || align="center"|1 || align="center"| || 51 || 759 || 197 || 22 || 237 || 14.9 || 3.9 || 0.4 || 4.6 || align=center|
|-
|align="left"| || align="center"|F/C || align="left"|Iowa || align="center"|1 || align="center"| || 6 || 125 || 35 || 5 || 29 || 20.8 || 5.8 || 0.8 || 4.8 || align=center|
|-
|align="left"| || align="center"|C || align="left"|Vanderbilt || align="center"|4 || align="center"|– || 261 || 5,250 || 1,796 || 146 || 1,462 || 20.1 || 6.9 || 0.6 || 5.6 || align=center|
|-
|align="left"| || align="center"|F || align="left"|Auburn || align="center"|3 || align="center"|– || 222 || 5,619 || 875 || 292 || 2,154 || 25.3 || 3.9 || 1.3 || 9.7 || align=center|
|-
|align="left"| || align="center"|G/F || align="left"|Bradley || align="center"|3 || align="center"|– || 119 || 1,227 || 169 || 123 || 601 || 10.3 || 1.4 || 1.0 || 5.1 || align=center|
|-
|align="left"| || align="center"|G || align="left"|SMU || align="center"|2 || align="center"|– || 31 || 184 || 21 || 14 || 78 || 5.9 || 0.7 || 0.5 || 2.5 || align=center|
|-
|align="left" bgcolor="#CCFFCC"|x || align="center"|C || align="left"|Utah || align="center"|4 || align="center"|–  || 280 || 6,259 || 1,966 || 532 || 2,303 || 22.4 || 7.0 || 1.9 || 8.2 || align=center|
|-
|align="left"| || align="center"|G/F || align="left"|Washington || align="center"|1 || align="center"| || 53 || 292 || 46 || 24 || 98 || 5.5 || 0.9 || 0.5 || 1.8 || align=center|
|-
|align="left"| || align="center"|G || align="left"|Wisconsin-Stevens Point || align="center"|3 || align="center"|– || 220 || 4,585 || 556 || 677 || 1,613 || 20.8 || 2.5 || 3.1 || 7.3 || align=center|
|-
|align="left" bgcolor="#FFCC00"|+ || align="center"|F/C || align="left"|Portland || align="center"|3 || align="center"|– || 228 || 7,721 || 2,047 || 471 || 4,392 || 33.9 || 9.0 || 2.1 || 19.3 || align=center|
|-
|align="left"| || align="center"|G/F || align="left"|Tulsa || align="center"|2 || align="center"|– || 126 || 2,442 || 271 || 413 || 679 || 19.4 || 2.2 || 3.3 || 5.4 || align=center|
|-
|align="left" bgcolor="#CCFFCC"|x || align="center"|G || align="left"|Alabama || align="center"|1 || align="center"|  || 50 || 965 || 113 || 81 || 288 || 19.3 || 2.3 || 1.6 || 5.8 || align=center|
|-
|align="left"| || align="center"|G/F || align="left"|Xavier || align="center"|1 || align="center"| || 6 || 57 || 14 || 1 || 26 || 9.5 || 2.3 || 0.2 || 4.3 || align=center|
|-
|align="left"| || align="center"|G || align="left"|Notre Dame || align="center"|1 || align="center"| || 41 || 292 || 25 || 42 || 81 || 7.1 || 0.6 || 1.0 || 2.0 || align=center|
|}

R to S

|-
|align="left"| || align="center"|F || align="left"|South Alabama || align="center"|2 || align="center"|– || 83 || 929 || 124 || 62 || 287 || 11.2 || 1.5 || 0.7 || 3.5 || align=center|
|-
|align="left"| || align="center"|F/C || align="left"|Wyoming || align="center"|1 || align="center"| || 21 || 183 || 40 || 9 || 34 || 8.7 || 1.9 || 0.4 || 1.6 || align=center|
|-
|align="left"| || align="center"|F || align="left"|North Carolina || align="center"|4 || align="center"|– || 249 || 5,145 || 1,122 || 198 || 2,051 || 20.7 || 4.5 || 0.8 || 8.2 || align=center|
|-
|align="left"| || align="center"|F || align="left"|Michigan || align="center"|1 || align="center"| || 4 || 42 || 7 || 1 || 16 || 10.5 || 1.8 || 0.3 || 4.0 || align=center|
|-
|align="left"| || align="center"|F/C || align="left"|San Francisco || align="center"|3 || align="center"|– || 159 || 3,110 || 595 || 277 || 1,344 || 19.6 || 3.7 || 1.7 || 8.5 || align=center|
|-
|align="left"| || align="center"|F || align="left"|Tulane || align="center"|1 || align="center"| || 3 || 6 || 0 || 0 || 2 || 2.0 || 0.0 || 0.0 || 0.7 || align=center|
|-
|align="left"| || align="center"|G/F || align="left"|Delta State || align="center"|1 || align="center"| || 5 || 29 || 1 || 1 || 10 || 5.8 || 0.2 || 0.2 || 2.0 || align=center|
|-
|align="left" bgcolor="#CCFFCC"|x || align="center"|G/F || align="left"|Tennessee || align="center"|1 || align="center"|– || 21 || 513 || 60 || 49 || 239 || 24.4 || 2.9 || 2.3 || 11.4 || align=center|
|-
|align="left"| || align="center"|G || align="left"|Marquette || align="center"|2 || align="center"|– || 138 || 2,177 || 238 || 277 || 613 || 15.8 || 1.7 || 2.0 || 4.4 || align=center|
|-
|align="left"| || align="center"|F/C || align="left"|BYU || align="center"|2 || align="center"|– || 101 || 1,836 || 339 || 120 || 690 || 18.2 || 3.4 || 1.2 || 6.8 || align=center|
|-
|align="left" bgcolor="#FFCC00"|+ || align="center"|G || align="left"|Arkansas || align="center"|5 || align="center"|– || 389 || 12,525 || 2,087 || 2,094 || 6,285 || 32.2 || 5.4 || 5.4 || 16.2 || align=center|
|-
|align="left" bgcolor="#FFFF99"|^ (#50) || align="center"|C || align="left"|Navy || align="center"|14 || align="center"|– || 987 || 34,271 || 10,497 || 2,441 || 20,790 || 34.7 || 10.6 || 2.5 || 21.1 || align=center|
|-
|align="left"| || align="center"|F || align="left"|Purdue || align="center"|1 || align="center"| || 9 || 157 || 24 || 8 || 90 || 17.4 || 2.7 || 0.9 || 10.0 || align=center|
|-
|align="left"| || align="center"|G || align="left"|UAB || align="center"|1 || align="center"| || 35 || 147 || 17 || 21 || 101 || 4.2 || 0.5 || 0.6 || 2.9 || align=center|
|-
|align="left"| || align="center"|F/C || align="left"|Kansas || align="center"|1 || align="center"| || 4 || 37 || 8 || 1 || 8 || 9.3 || 2.0 || 0.3 || 2.0 || align=center|
|-
|align="left" bgcolor="#FFFF99"|^ || align="center"|F || align="left"|Southeastern Oklahoma State || align="center"|2 || align="center"|– || 128 || 4,557 || 2,190 || 281 || 719 || 35.6 || bgcolor="#CFECEC"|17.1 || 2.2 || 5.6 || align=center|
|-
|align="left"| || align="center"|F || align="left"|Drexel || align="center"|8 || align="center"|– || 509 || 9,373 || 2,460 || 438 || 3,815 || 18.4 || 4.8 || 0.9 || 7.5 || align=center|
|-
|align="left"| || align="center"|F || align="left"|Wisconsin || align="center"|1 || align="center"| || 47 || 464 || 56 || 48 || 158 || 9.9 || 1.2 || 1.0 || 3.4 || align=center|
|-
|align="left"| || align="center"|F || align="left"|Notre Dame || align="center"|1 || align="center"| || 60 || 718 || 124 || 34 || 252 || 12.0 || 2.1 || 0.6 || 4.2 || align=center|
|-
|align="left"| || align="center"|G || align="left"|North Texas || align="center"|1 || align="center"| || 16 || 157 || 23 || 6 || 65 || 9.8 || 1.4 || 0.4 || 4.1 || align=center|
|-
|align="left"|  || align="center"|F || align="left"| KK Olimpija || align="center"|2 || align="center"|– || 36 || 356 || 78 || 21 || 138 || 9.9 || 2.2 || 0.6 || 3.8 || align=center|
|-
|align="left"| || align="center"|G/F || align="left"|Southern || align="center"|1 || align="center"| || 22 || 263 || 59 || 35 || 132 || 12.0 || 2.7 || 1.6 || 6.0 || align=center|
|-
|align="left"| || align="center"|G/F || align="left"|Oklahoma State || align="center"|1 || align="center"| || 16 || 113 || 23 || 3 || 41 || 7.1 || 1.4 || 0.2 || 2.6 || align=center|
|-
|align="left"| || align="center"|G/F || align="left"|UCLA || align="center"|1 || align="center"| || 26 || 393 || 94 || 19 || 183 || 15.1 || 3.6 || 0.7 || 7.0 || align=center|
|-
|align="left"| || align="center"|F || align="left"|New Mexico || align="center"|1 || align="center"| || 1 || 2 || 0 || 0 || 0 || 2.0 || 0.0 || 0.0 || 0.0 || align=center|
|-
|align="left"| || align="center"|F || align="left"|Texas Tech || align="center"|1 || align="center"| || 6 || 62 || 7 || 1 || 17 || 10.3 || 1.2 || 0.2 || 2.8 || align=center|
|-
|align="left"| || align="center"|G || align="left"| FC Barcelona || align="center"|1 || align="center"|– || 1 || 9 || 1 || 0 || 3 || 9.0 || 1.0 || 0.0 || 3.0 || align=center|
|-
|align="left"| || align="center"|G || align="left"|Oregon || align="center"|1 || align="center"| || 1 || 0 || 0 || 0 || 0 || 0.0 || 0.0 || 0.0 || 0.0 || align=center|
|-
|align="left"| || align="center"|C || align="left"|Florida || align="center"|1 || align="center"| || 42 || 398 || 121 || 17 || 158 || 9.5 || 2.9 || 0.4 || 3.8 || align=center|
|-
|align="left"| || align="center"|C || align="left"|St. John's || align="center"|1 || align="center"| || 27 || 144 || 50 || 4 || 43 || 5.3 || 1.9 || 0.1 || 1.6 || align=center|
|-
|align="left"| || align="center"|F || align="left"|Alabama State || align="center"|1 || align="center"| || 8 || 51 || 4 || 2 || 13 || 6.4 || 0.5 || 0.3 || 1.6 || align=center|
|-
|align="left"| || align="center"|F/C || align="left"|Notre Dame || align="center"|2 || align="center"|– || 49 || 1,296 || 301 || 76 || 556 || 26.4 || 6.1 || 1.6 || 11.3 || align=center|
|-
|align="left" bgcolor="#FFCC00"|+ (#13) || align="center"|G || align="left"|Stephen F. Austin || align="center"|9 || align="center"|– || 618 || 18,916 || 1,960 || 2,406 || 10,290 || 30.6 || 3.2 || 3.9 || 16.7 || align=center|
|-
|align="left"| || align="center"|G/F || align="left"|DePaul || align="center"|1 || align="center"| || 2 || 16 || 0 || 2 || 0 || 8.0 || 0.0 || 1.0 || 0.0 || align=center|
|-
|align="left"| || align="center"|G/F || align="left"|Houston || align="center"|2 || align="center"|– || 133 || 2,205 || 256 || 184 || 814 || 16.6 || 1.9 || 1.4 || 6.1 || align=center|
|-
|align="left"| || align="center"|G || align="left"|Missouri || align="center"|1 || align="center"| || 12 || 95 || 13 || 20 || 30 || 7.9 || 1.1 || 1.7 || 2.5 || align=center|
|-
|align="left"| || align="center"|G || align="left"|Indiana || align="center"|1 || align="center"| || 2 || 12 || 1 || 2 || 2 || 6.0 || 0.5 || 1.0 || 1.0 || align=center|
|-
|align="left"| || align="center"|F/C || align="left"|Pittsburgh || align="center"|2 || align="center"|– || 51 || 1,155 || 267 || 50 || 394 || 22.6 || 5.2 || 1.0 || 7.7 || align=center|
|-
|align="left"| || align="center"|G || align="left"|New Mexico || align="center"|1 || align="center"| || 60 || 1,141 || 133 || 80 || 441 || 19.0 || 2.2 || 1.3 || 7.4 || align=center|
|-
|align="left"| || align="center"|C || align="left"|CSU–Pueblo || align="center"|2 || align="center"|– || 125 || 3,138 || 1,138 || 110 || 840 || 25.1 || 9.1 || 0.9 || 6.7 || align=center|
|-
|align="left"| || align="center"|F || align="left"|Tulsa || align="center"|1 || align="center"| || 19 || 164 || 24 || 7 || 82 || 8.6 || 1.3 || 0.4 || 4.3 || align=center|
|-
|align="left"| || align="center"|F/C || align="left"|Alcorn State || align="center"|1 || align="center"| || 66 || 833 || 268 || 28 || 85 || 12.6 || 4.1 || 0.4 || 1.3 || align=center|
|-
|align="left"| || align="center"|G || align="left"|UNLV || align="center"|1 || align="center"| || 7 || 25 || 3 || 2 || 12 || 3.6 || 0.4 || 0.3 || 1.7 || align=center|
|-
|align="left"| || align="center"|G || align="left"|Michigan State || align="center"|2 || align="center"|– || 130 || 3,243 || 292 || 221 || 1,255 || 24.9 || 2.2 || 1.7 || 9.7 || align=center|
|-
|align="left"| || align="center"|C || align="left"|Canisius || align="center"|1 || align="center"| || 43 || 623 || 129 || 12 || 193 || 14.5 || 3.0 || 0.3 || 4.5 || align=center|
|-
|align="left"| || align="center"|C || align="left"|Louisville || align="center"|1 || align="center"| || 26 || 149 || 39 || 3 || 50 || 5.7 || 1.5 || 0.1 || 1.9 || align=center|
|-
|align="left"| || align="center"|F/C || align="left"| Saski Baskonia || align="center"|5 || align="center"|– || 311 || 6,157 || 1,637 || 389 || 2,576 || 19.8 || 5.3 || 1.3 || 8.3 || align=center|
|-
|align="left"| || align="center"|G || align="left"|Arizona || align="center"|1 || align="center"| || 31 || 413 || 47 || 53 || 106 || 13.3 || 1.5 || 1.7 || 3.4 || align=center|
|-
|align="left"| || align="center"|G || align="left"|DePaul || align="center"|3 || align="center"|– || 146 || 5,250 || 617 || 1,203 || 2,026 || 36.0 || 4.2 || 8.2 || 13.9 || align=center|
|-
|align="left"| || align="center"|F || align="left"|Montana || align="center"|1 || align="center"| || 1 || 2 || 0 || 0 || 0 || 2.0 || 0.0 || 0.0 || 0.0 || align=center|
|-
|align="left"| || align="center"|G || align="left"|Missouri || align="center"|3 || align="center"|– || 198 || 3,939 || 226 || 759 || 1,771 || 19.9 || 1.1 || 3.8 || 8.9 || align=center|
|-
|align="left"| || align="center"|G || align="left"|Oral Roberts || align="center"|1 || align="center"| || 67 || 601 || 47 || 91 || 246 || 9.0 || 0.7 || 1.4 || 3.7 || align=center|
|-
|align="left"| || align="center"|G || align="left"|East Tennessee State || align="center"|2 || align="center"|– || 58 || 1,276 || 98 || 165 || 564 || 22.0 || 1.7 || 2.8 || 9.7 || align=center|
|}

T to V

|-
|align="left"| || align="center"|G/F || align="left"|Bradley || align="center"|1 || align="center"| || 33 || 821 || 133 || 101 || 432 || 24.9 || 4.0 || 3.1 || 13.1 || align=center|
|-
|align="left"| || align="center"|F || align="left"|LSU || align="center"|1 || align="center"| || 24 || 102 || 31 || 15 || 42 || 4.3 || 1.3 || 0.6 || 1.8 || align=center|
|-
|align="left"| || align="center"|G || align="left"|LSU || align="center"|2 || align="center"|– || 16 || 214 || 16 || 14 || 82 || 13.4 || 1.0 || 0.9 || 5.1 || align=center|
|-
|align="left"| || align="center"|F || align="left"|Long Beach State || align="center"|2 || align="center"|– || 140 || 2,279 || 383 || 141 || 639 || 16.3 || 2.7 || 1.0 || 4.6 || align=center|
|-
|align="left"| || align="center"|G/F || align="left"|Bradley || align="center"|1 || align="center"| || 2 || 52 || 7 || 3 || 15 || 26.0 || 3.5 || 1.5 || 7.5 || align=center|
|-
|align="left"| || align="center"|F || align="left"|TCU || align="center"|2 || align="center"|– || 107 || 1,928 || 543 || 80 || 469 || 18.0 || 5.1 || 0.7 || 4.4 || align=center|
|-
|align="left"| || align="center"|F || align="left"|San Diego State || align="center"|2 || align="center"| || 4 || 30 || 12 || 1 || 3 || 7.5 || 3.0 || 0.3 || 0.8 || align=center|
|-
|align="left"| || align="center"|F/C || align="left"|Minnesota || align="center"|1 || align="center"| || 49 || 1,210 || 276 || 87 || 605 || 24.7 || 5.6 || 1.8 || 12.3 || align=center|
|-
|align="left"| || align="center"|F/C || align="left"|Creighton || align="center"|1 || align="center"| || 19 || 208 || 41 || 17 || 52 || 10.9 || 2.2 || 0.9 || 2.7 || align=center|
|-
|align="left"| || align="center"|G/F || align="left"|James Madison || align="center"|1 || align="center"| || 1 || 8 || 1 || 0 || 2 || 8.0 || 1.0 || 0.0 || 2.0 || align=center|
|-
|align="left"| || align="center"|C || align="left"|California || align="center"|1 || align="center"| || 16 || 86 || 38 || 2 || 39 || 5.4 || 2.4 || 0.1 || 2.4 || align=center|
|-
|align="left"| || align="center"|G || align="left"|Minnesota || align="center"|1 || align="center"| || 24 || 415 || 37 || 27 || 155 || 17.3 || 1.5 || 1.1 || 6.5 || align=center|
|-
|align="left"| || align="center"|F || align="left"| Anadolu Efes || align="center"|1 || align="center"| || 80 || 2,073 || 358 || 154 || 739 || 25.9 || 4.5 || 1.9 || 9.2 || align=center|
|-
|align="left"| || align="center"|F || align="left"|Portland State || align="center"|3 || align="center"|– || 160 || 2,481 || 434 || 130 || 726 || 15.5 || 2.7 || 0.8 || 4.5 || align=center|
|-
|align="left"| || align="center"|G || align="left"| Olimpia Milano || align="center"|3 || align="center"|– || 207 || 2,683 || 217 || 364 || 1,086 || 13.0 || 1.0 || 1.8 || 5.2 || align=center|
|-
|align="left"| || align="center"|G || align="left"|Cincinnati || align="center"|1 || align="center"| || 65 || 986 || 91 || 123 || 355 || 15.2 || 1.4 || 1.9 || 5.5 || align=center|
|-
|align="left"| || align="center"|F || align="left"|Azusa Pacific || align="center"|1 || align="center"| || 1 || 2 || 1 || 0 || 2 || 2.0 || 1.0 || 0.0 || 2.0 || align=center|
|-
|align="left" bgcolor="#CCFFCC"|x || align="center"|F || align="left"|Florida State || align="center"|2 || align="center"|– || 133 || 2,993 || 480 || 192 || 1,213 || 22.5 || 3.6 || 1.4 || 9.1 || align=center|
|-
|align="left"| || align="center"|G || align="left"|Kansas || align="center"|3 || align="center"|– || 168 || 2,191 || 164 || 345 || 563 || 13.0 || 1.0 || 2.1 || 3.4 || align=center|
|-
|align="left"| || align="center"|G || align="left"|Duke || align="center"|1 || align="center"| || 31 || 1,285 || 138 || 74 || 735 || bgcolor="#CFECEC"|41.5 || 4.5 || 2.4 || 23.7 || align=center|
|-
|align="left"| || align="center"|F || align="left"|Michigan State || align="center"|1 || align="center"| || 24 || 551 || 92 || 22 || 217 || 23.0 || 3.8 || 0.9 || 9.0 || align=center|
|}

W to Z

|-
|align="left" bgcolor="#CCFFCC"|x || align="center"|G || align="left"|Miami (FL) || align="center"|4 || align="center"|–  || 208 || 4,240 || 492 || 330 || 1,952 || 20.4 || 2.4 || 1.6 || 9.4 || align=center|
|-
|align="left"| || align="center"|F || align="left"|Louisville || align="center"|2 || align="center"|– || 132 || 1,943 || 515 || 67 || 681 || 14.7 || 3.9 || 0.5 || 5.2 || align=center|
|-
|align="left"| || align="center"|G || align="left"|Florida State || align="center"|1 || align="center"| || 36 || 425 || 48 || 45 || 119 || 11.8 || 1.3 || 1.3 || 3.3 || align=center|
|-
|align="left"| || align="center"|G/F || align="left"|Jackson State || align="center"|2 || align="center"|– || 88 || 859 || 173 || 41 || 413 || 9.8 || 2.0 || 0.5 || 4.7 || align=center|
|-
|align="left"| || align="center"|F || align="left"|Oklahoma City || align="center"|1 || align="center"| || 1 || 15 || 7 || 1 || 7 || 15.0 || 7.0 || 1.0 || 7.0 || align=center|
|-
|align="left"| || align="center"|G || align="left"|Vanderbilt || align="center"|3 || align="center"|– || 116 || 1,650 || 195 || 145 || 557 || 14.2 || 1.7 || 1.3 || 4.8 || align=center|
|-
|align="left"| || align="center"|G || align="left"|Memphis || align="center"|1 || align="center"| || 18 || 146 || 20 || 15 || 53 || 8.1 || 1.1 || 0.8 || 2.9 || align=center|
|-
|align="left"| || align="center"|G || align="left"|Mississippi State || align="center"|2 || align="center"|– || 31 || 199 || 18 || 19 || 58 || 6.4 || 0.6 || 0.6 || 1.9 || align=center|
|-
|align="left"| || align="center"|F || align="left"|William & Mary || align="center"|1 || align="center"| || 8 || 38 || 11 || 0 || 8 || 4.8 || 1.4 || 0.0 || 1.0 || align=center|
|-
|align="left"| || align="center"|C || align="left"|Washington || align="center"|1 || align="center"| || 13 || 56 || 12 || 5 || 15 || 4.3 || 0.9 || 0.4 || 1.2 || align=center|
|-
|align="left"| || align="center"|F/C || align="left"|Xavier || align="center"|1 || align="center"| || 78 || 1,404 || 309 || 143 || 554 || 18.0 || 4.0 || 1.8 || 7.1 || align=center|
|-
|align="left"| || align="center"|G || align="left"|Alabama || align="center"|1 || align="center"| || 2 || 14 || 0 || 3 || 2 || 7.0 || 0.0 || 1.5 || 1.0 || align=center|
|-
|align="left"| || align="center"|G || align="left"|Colorado || align="center"|5 || align="center"|– || 237 || 6,094 || 776 || 914 || 2,741 || 25.7 || 3.3 || 3.9 || 11.6 || align=center|
|-
|align="left"| || align="center"|G/F || align="left"|Cincinnati || align="center"|1 || align="center"| || 6 || 137 || 20 || 5 || 50 || 22.8 || 3.3 || 0.8 || 8.3 || align=center|
|-
|align="left"| || align="center"|F/C || align="left"|Marquette || align="center"|1 || align="center"| || 52 || 580 || 129 || 17 || 168 || 11.2 || 2.5 || 0.3 || 3.2 || align=center|
|-
|align="left"| || align="center"|G || align="left"|Clemson || align="center"|2 || align="center"|– || 65 || 518 || 42 || 81 || 114 || 8.0 || 0.6 || 1.2 || 1.8 || align=center|
|-
|align="left" bgcolor="#CCFFCC"|x || align="center"|G || align="left"|Iowa || align="center"|1 || align="center"| || 29 || 205 || 14 || 9 || 61 || 7.1 || 0.5 || 0.3 || 2.1 || align=center|
|-
|align="left"| || align="center"|C || align="left"|Wichita State || align="center"|1 || align="center"| || 1 || 21 || 3 || 0 || 1 || 21.0 || 3.0 || 0.0 || 1.0 || align=center|
|-
|align="left"| || align="center"|F || align="left"|Long Beach State || align="center"|1 || align="center"| || 33 || 271 || 64 || 11 || 188 || 8.2 || 1.9 || 0.3 || 5.7 || align=center|
|-
|align="left"| || align="center"|G || align="left"|Long Beach State || align="center"|1 || align="center"| || 3 || 13 || 1 || 1 || 6 || 4.3 || 0.3 || 0.3 || 2.0 || align=center|
|-
|align="left" bgcolor="#FFFF99"|^ || align="center"|G/F || align="left"|Georgia || align="center"|1 || align="center"| || 63 || 1,945 || 402 || 119 || 1,145 || 30.9 || 6.4 || 1.9 || 18.2 || align=center|
|-
|align="left"| || align="center"|F/C || align="left"|Illinois State || align="center"|1 || align="center"| || 27 || 522 || 127 || 18 || 130 || 19.3 || 4.7 || 0.7 || 4.8 || align=center|
|-
|align="left"| || align="center"|G || align="left"|Rice || align="center"|1 || align="center"| || 48 || 278 || 25 || 33 || 81 || 5.8 || 0.5 || 0.7 || 1.7 || align=center|
|-
|align="left"| || align="center"|G || align="left"|Davidson || align="center"|1 || align="center"| || 3 || 4 || 1 || 0 || 2 || 1.3 || 0.3 || 0.0 || 0.7 || align=center|
|-
|align="left"| || align="center"|F || align="left"|Providence || align="center"|1 || align="center"| || 16 || 88 || 14 || 6 || 42 || 5.5 || 0.9 || 0.4 || 2.6 || align=center|
|-
|align="left"| || align="center"|G || align="left"|St. John's || align="center"|1 || align="center"| || 19 || 200 || 13 || 43 || 75 || 10.5 || 0.7 || 2.3 || 3.9 || align=center|
|-
|align="left"| || align="center"|F || align="left"|Arizona || align="center"|2 || align="center"|– || 3 || 5 || 0 || 0 || 4 || 1.7 || 0.0 || 0.0 || 1.3 || align=center|
|-
|align="left"| || align="center"|F || align="left"|Notre Dame || align="center"|3 || align="center"|– || 154 || 2,781 || 408 || 184 || 1,090 || 18.1 || 2.6 || 1.2 || 7.1 || align=center|
|-
|align="left"| || align="center"|G || align="left"|Minnesota || align="center"|1 || align="center"| || 23 || 397 || 37 || 111 || 164 || 17.3 || 1.6 || 4.8 || 7.1 || align=center|
|-
|align="left"| || align="center"|G/F || align="left"|Georgetown || align="center"|2 || align="center"|– || 32 || 422 || 67 || 51 || 213 || 13.2 || 2.1 || 1.6 || 6.7 || align=center|
|-
|align="left"| || align="center"|F || align="left"|VMI || align="center"|1 || align="center"| || 20 || 105 || 17 || 10 || 37 || 5.3 || 0.9 || 0.5 || 1.9 || align=center|
|-
|align="left"| || align="center"|F/C || align="left"|Michigan State || align="center"|2 || align="center"|– || 119 || 1,213 || 324 || 35 || 461 || 10.2 || 2.7 || 0.3 || 3.9 || align=center|
|-
|align="left"| || align="center"|F/C || align="left"|Dwight Morrow HS (NJ) || align="center"|1 || align="center"| || 52 || 1,062 || 190 || 56 || 319 || 20.4 || 3.7 || 1.1 || 6.1 || align=center|
|-
|align="left"| || align="center"|F || align="left"|Kansas || align="center"|1 || align="center"| || 69 || 1,562 || 450 || 55 || 616 || 22.6 || 6.5 || 0.8 || 8.9 || align=center|
|-
|align="left"| || align="center"|G || align="left"|George Mason || align="center"|1 || align="center"| || 18 || 373 || 26 || 63 || 104 || 20.7 || 1.4 || 3.5 || 5.8 || align=center|
|-
|align="left"| || align="center"|G/F || align="left"|Georgetown || align="center"|2 || align="center"|– || 103 || 2,419 || 270 || 254 || 663 || 23.5 || 2.6 || 2.5 || 6.4 || align=center|
|-
|align="left"| || align="center"|G || align="left"|Clemson || align="center"|1 || align="center"| || 2 || 10 || 3 || 1 || 4 || 5.0 || 1.5 || 0.5 || 2.0 || align=center|
|-
|align="left"| || align="center"|F || align="left"|Western Carolina || align="center"|1 || align="center"| || 5 || 30 || 9 || 0 || 8 || 6.0 || 1.8 || 0.0 || 1.6 || align=center|
|-
|align="left"| || align="center"|F || align="left"|Nevada || align="center"|1 || align="center"| || 64 || 598 || 97 || 34 || 155 || 9.3 || 1.5 || 0.5 || 2.4 || align=center|
|-
|align="left"| || align="center"|G || align="left"|Cal State Fullerton || align="center"|1 || align="center"| || 38 || 830 || 51 || 155 || 352 || 21.8 || 1.3 || 4.1 || 9.3 || align=center|
|-
|align="left"| || align="center"|F || align="left"|North Carolina || align="center"|1 || align="center"| || 10 || 70 || 27 || 3 || 33 || 7.0 || 2.7 || 0.3 || 3.3 || align=center|
|-
|align="left"| || align="center"|F || align="left"|Georgia Tech || align="center"|1 || align="center"| || 26 || 370 || 93 || 59 || 158 || 14.2 || 3.6 || 2.3 || 1.3 || align=center|
|-
|align="left"| || align="center"|C || align="left"|North Carolina || align="center"|1 || align="center"| || 2 || 4 || 4 || 0 || 2 || 2.0 || 2.0 || 0.0 || 1.0 || align=center|
|-
|align="left"| || align="center"|C || align="left"|Washington || align="center"|1 || align="center"| || 8 || 58 || 13 || 3 || 30 || 7.3 || 1.6 || 0.4 || 3.8 || align=center|
|}

International players

In the National Basketball Association (NBA), foreign players—also known as international players—are those who were born outside of the United States. Players who were born in U.S. overseas territories, such as Puerto Rico, U.S. Virgin Islands and Guam, are considered international players even if they are U.S. citizens. In some borderline cases, the NBA takes into consideration whether a player desires to be identified as international. 52 international players have played for the Spurs. The first foreign-born player in franchise history is Bobby Croft. Croft, who was the first Canadian player to earn a scholarship to a major U.S. basketball college, played one season for the Texas Chaparrals in the ABA.

In the 1997 draft, the Spurs drafted Tim Duncan who was born in the U.S. Virgin Islands. Although Duncan is a United States citizen, the NBA considers him an international player. In the 1999 and 2001 draft, the Spurs drafted Manu Ginóbili from Argentina and Tony Parker from France respectively. These three international players, Duncan, Ginóbili and Parker, played together from 2002 until Duncan's retirement in 2016, became All-Stars and led the Spurs to four NBA titles. Aside from the "Big Three" of Duncan, Ginóbili and Parker, the number of international players in the Spurs roster also grew in the 2000s. On the opening day of the 2013–14 season, the Spurs set the record for the most international players on a team roster with ten international players from seven countries.

The following is a list of international players who have played for the Spurs, listed by their national team affiliation.

 Argentina
 Manu Ginóbili
 Nicolás Laprovíttola
 Fabricio Oberto

 Austria
 Jakob Pöltl

 Australia
 Aron Baynes (born in New Zealand, grew up in Australia, became a naturalized Australian citizen, represents Australia internationally)
 Andrew Gaze
 Shane Heal
 Jock Landale
 Patty Mills

 The Bahamas
 Mychal Thompson (born in the Bahamas but never represented the Bahamas internationally)

 Brazil
 Alex Garcia
 Tiago Splitter

 Canada
 Joel Anthony
 Bobby Croft
 Cory Joseph
 Trey Lyles
 Joshua Primo
 Mike Smrek

 China
 Mengke Bateer

 Croatia
 Luka Šamanić

 Czech Republic
 Tomáš Satoranský

 France
 Nando de Colo
 Boris Diaw
 Joffrey Lauvergne
 Ian Mahinmi
 Tony Parker (born in Belgium to an American father and a Dutch mother, grew up in France, represents France internationally)

 Germany
 Uwe Blab (born in West Germany, also represented West German internationally before the reunification)
 Chris Welp (born in West Germany, also represented West German internationally before the reunification)

 Great Britain
 Pops Mensah-Bonsu

 Iceland
 Pétur Guðmundsson

 Italy
 Marco Belinelli
 Mike D'Antoni (born in the United States, has dual U.S. and Italian citizenships, represented Italy internationally)

 Latvia
 Dāvis Bertāns

 Macedonia
 Darius Washington, Jr. (born in the United States, became a naturalized Macedonian citizen, represents Macedonia internationally)

 Netherlands
 Francisco Elson
 Swen Nater (born in the Netherlands, grew up in the United States, but never represented the Netherlands internationally)

 New Zealand
 Sean Marks

 Nigeria
 Ike Diogu (born in the United States to Nigerian parents, represents Nigeria internationally)
 Julius Nwosu
 Ime Udoka (born in the United States to a Nigerian father, represented Nigeria internationally)

 Senegal
 Gorgui Dieng

 Serbia
 Boban Marjanović
 Žarko Paspalj (born in SR Montenegro, SFR Yugoslavia (now Montenegro), represented SFR Yugoslavia and FR Yugoslavia internationally)

 Slovenia
 Radoslav Nesterović (born in SR Slovenia, SFR Yugoslavia (now Slovenia), represented Slovenia internationally)
 Beno Udrih (born in SR Slovenia, SFR Yugoslavia (now Slovenia), represented Slovenia internationally)

 Spain
 Pau Gasol
 Juancho Hernangómez

 Turkey
 Hedo Türkoğlu

 United States
 Tim Duncan (born in U.S. Virgin Islands, represented the United States internationally)
 Steve Kerr (born in Lebanon to American parents, represented the United States internationally)
 Dominique Wilkins (born in France to American parents, represented the United States internationally)

 Venezuela
 Carl Herrera (born in Trinidad and Tobago, became a naturalized Venezuelan citizen, represented Venezuela internationally.

Notes
 Players can sometimes be assigned more than one jersey number.
 Each year is linked to an article about that particular ABA or NBA season.
 Only includes achievements as Spurs players.

References
General

 
 
 

Specific

External links
San Antonio Spurs official website

National Basketball Association all-time rosters
 
roster